= Metal acetylacetonates =

Class of chemical compounds

Metal acetylacetonates are coordination complexes derived from the acetylacetonate anion (CH_{3}COCHCOCH^{−}_{3}) and metal ions, usually transition metals. The bidentate ligand acetylacetonate is often abbreviated acac. Typically both oxygen atoms bind to the metal to form a six-membered chelate ring. The simplest complexes have the formula M(acac)_{3} and M(acac)_{2}. Mixed-ligand complexes, e.g. VO(acac)_{2}, are also numerous. Variations of acetylacetonate have also been developed with myriad substituents in place of methyl (RCOCHCOR′^{−}). Many such complexes are soluble in organic solvents, in contrast to the related metal halides. Because of these properties, acac complexes are sometimes used as catalyst precursors and reagents. Applications include their use as NMR "shift reagents" and as catalysts for organic synthesis, and precursors to industrial hydroformylation catalysts. C_{5}H_{7}O^{−}_{2} in some cases also binds to metals through the central carbon atom; this bonding mode is more common for the third-row transition metals such as platinum(II) and iridium(III).

== Synthesis ==
The usual synthesis involves treatment of a metal salt with acetylacetone, acacH:

M^{z+} + z Hacac ⇌ M(acac)_{z} + z H^{+}

Addition of base assists the removal of a proton from acetylacetone and shifts the equilibrium in favour of the complex. Both oxygen centres bind to the metal to form a six-membered chelate ring. In some cases the chelate effect is so strong that no added base is needed to form the complex. Some complexes are prepared by metathesis using Tl(acac).

== Structure and bonding ==
In the majority of its complexes acac forms six-membered C_{3}O_{2}M chelate rings. The M(acac) ring is planar with a symmetry plane bisecting the ring.

The acacM ring generally exhibits aromatic character, consistent with delocalized bonding in the monoanionic C_{3}O_{2} portion. Consistent with this scenario, in some complexes, the acac ligand is susceptible to electrophilic substitution, akin to electrophilic aromatic substitution (in this equation Me = CH_{3}):

Co(O_{2}C_{3}Me_{2}H)_{3} + 3 NO_{2}^{+} → Co(O_{2}C_{3}Me_{2}NO_{2})_{3} + 3 H^{+}

In terms of electron counting, neutral bidentate O,O-bonded acac ligand is an "L-X ligand", i.e. a combination of a Lewis base (L) and a pseudohalide (X).

An exception to the classical description presented above, the bis(pyridine) adduct of chromium(II) acetylacetonate features noninnocent acac^{2-} ligand.

== Classification by triad ==
=== Titanium triad ===
Treatment of TiCl_{4} with acetylacetone gives TiCl_{2}(acac)_{2}, a red-coloured, octahedral complex with C_{2} symmetry:

TiCl_{4} + 2 Hacac → TiCl_{2}(acac)_{2} + 2 HCl

This reaction requires no base. Under atmospheric conditions the dibromo complex is easily hydrolyzed (1 hr), whereas the dichloro and difluoro complexes are not easily hydrolyzed (1-3 days). The complex TiCl_{2}(acac)_{2} is fluxional in solution, the NMR spectrum exhibiting a single methyl resonance at room temperature.

Unlike Ti(IV), both Zr(IV) and Hf(IV) bind four bidentate acetylacetonates, reflecting the larger radius of these metals. Hafnium acetylacetonate and zirconium acetylacetonate adopt square antiprismatic structures.

Regarding acetylacetonates of titanium(III), Ti(acac)_{3} is well studied. This blue-colored compound forms from titanium trichloride and acetylacetone.

=== Vanadium triad ===
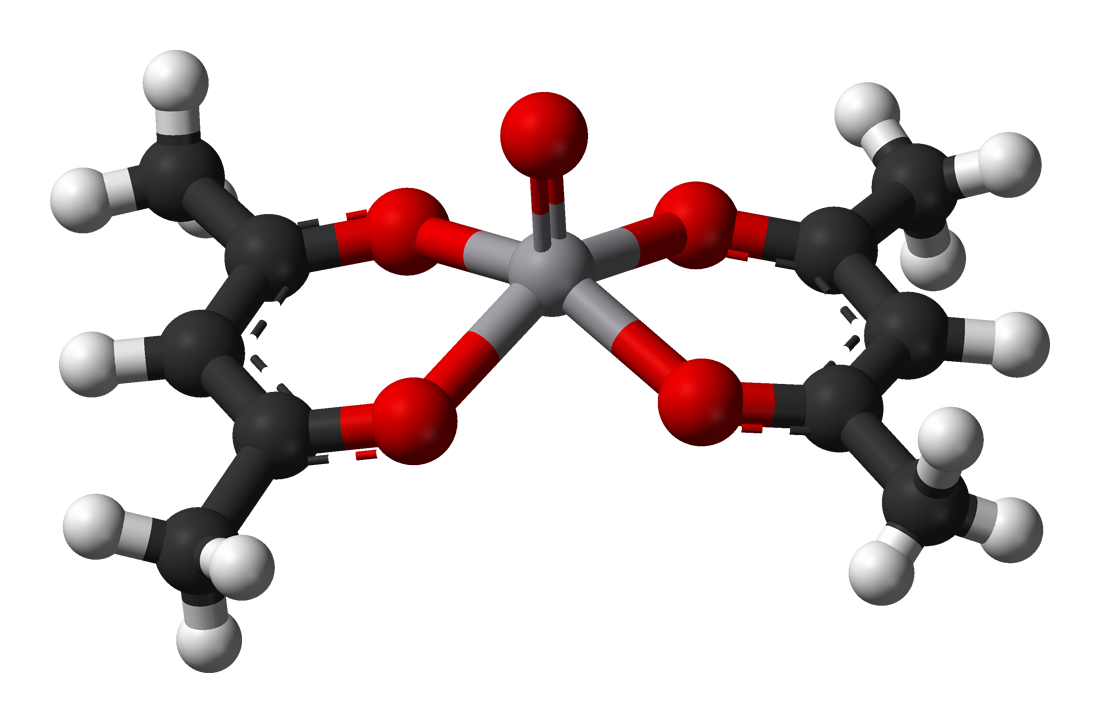
A ball-and-stick model of VO(acac)_{2}

Vanadyl acetylacetonate is a blue complex with the formula V(O)(acac)_{2}. This complex features the vanadyl(IV) group, and many related compounds are known. The molecule is square pyramidal, with idealized C_{2v} symmetry. The complex catalyzes epoxidation of allylic alcohols by peroxides. Vanadium(III) acetylacetonate is a dark-brown solid. Vanadium β-diketonate complexes are used as precatalysts in the commercial production of ethylene-propylene-diene elastomers (EPDM). They are often evaluated for other applications related to redox flow batteries, diabetes and enhancing the activity of insulin, and as precursors to inorganic materials by CVD.

=== Chromium triad ===
Chromium(III) acetylacetonate, Cr(acac)_{3}, is a typical octahedral complex containing three acac^{−} ligands. Like most such compounds, it is highly soluble in nonpolar organic solvents. This particular complex, which has a three unpaired electrons, is used as a spin relaxation agent to improve the sensitivity in quantitative carbon-13 NMR spectroscopy. Chromium(II) acetylacetonate is a highly oxygen-sensitive, light brown compound. The complex adopts a square planar structure, weakly associated into stacks in the solid state. It is isomorphous with Pd(acac)_{2} and Cu(acac)_{2}. Mo(acac)_{3}, a purple, air sensitive complex, is prepared by salt metathesis from hexachloromolybdate.

=== Manganese triad ===
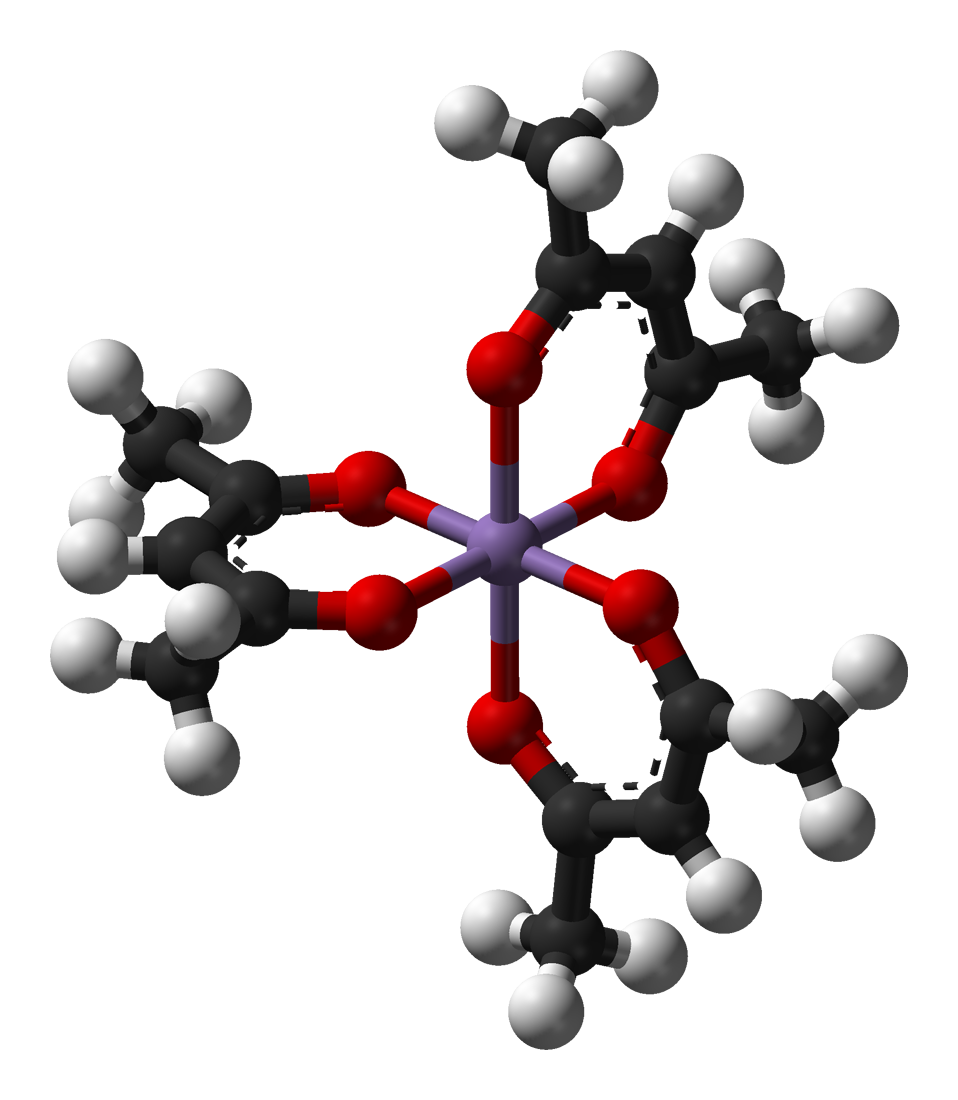
Ball-and-stick model of Δ-Mn(acac)_{3}, with Jahn–Teller tetragonal elongation

Mn(acac)_{3} has been prepared by the comproportionation of the manganese(II) compound Mn(acac)_{2} with potassium permanganate in the presence of additional acetylacetone. Alternatively the direct reaction of acetylacetone with potassium permanganate. In terms of electronic structure, Mn(acac)_{3} is high spin. Its distorted octahedral structure reflects geometric distortions due to the Jahn–Teller effect. The two most common structures for this complex include one with tetragonal elongation and one with tetragonal compression. For the elongation, two Mn–O bonds are 2.12 Å while the other four are 1.93 Å. For the compression, two Mn–O bonds are 1.95 Å and the other four are 2.00 Å. The effects of the tetragonal elongation are noticeably more significant than the effects of the tetragonal compression.

In organic chemistry, Mn(acac)_{3} has been used as a one-electron oxidant for coupling phenols.

The electron transfer rates for Mn(acac)3 have been evaluated.-

Mn(acac)_{2} is a tan solid obtained by vacuum drying the yellow dihydrate Mn(acac)_{2}(H_{2}O)_{2}.

=== Iron triad ===
Iron(III) acetylacetonate, Fe(acac)_{3}, is a red high-spin complex that is highly soluble in organic solvents. It is a high-spin complex with five unpaired electrons. It has occasionally been investigated as a catalyst precursor. Fe(acac)_{3} has been partially resolved into its Δ and Λ isomers. The ferrous complex Fe(acac)_{2} is oligomeric.

Like iron, Ru(III) forms a stable tris(acetylacetonate). Reduction of this Ru(III) derivative in the presence of other ligands affords mixed ligand complexes, e.g. Ru(acac)_{2}(alkene)_{2}.

=== Cobalt triad ===
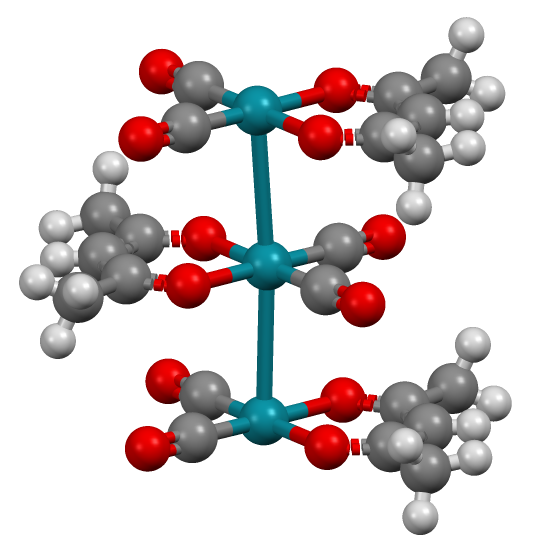
Rh(acac)(CO)_{2} showing the "stacking" of the individual planar units through Rh---Rh interactions.

Tris(acetylacetonato)cobalt(III), Co(acac)_{3}, is low-spin, diamagnetic complex. Like other compounds of the type M(acac)_{3}, this complex is chiral (has a non-superimposable mirror image).

The synthesis of Co(acac)_{3} involves the use of an oxidant since the cobalt precursors are divalent:

2 CoCO_{3} + 6 Hacac + H_{2}O_{2} → 2 Co(acac)_{3} + 4 H_{2}O + 2 CO_{2}

The complex "Co(acac)_{2}", like the nickel complex with analogous stoichiometry, is typically isolated with two additional ligands, i.e. octahedral Co(acac)_{2}L_{2}. The anhydrous form exists as the tetramer [Co(acac)_{2}]_{4}. Like the trimeric nickel complex, this tetramer shows ferromagnetic interactions at low temperatures.

Ir(acac)_{3} and Rh(acac)_{3} are known. A second linkage isomer of the iridium complex is known, trans-Ir(acac)_{2}(CH(COMe)_{2})(H_{2}O). This C-bonded derivative is a precursor to homogeneous catalysts for C–H activation and related chemistries.

Two well-studied acetylacetonates of rhodium(I) and iridium(I) are Rh(acac)(CO)_{2} and Ir(acac)(CO)_{2}. These complexes are square-planar, with C_{2v} symmetry.

=== Nickel triad ===
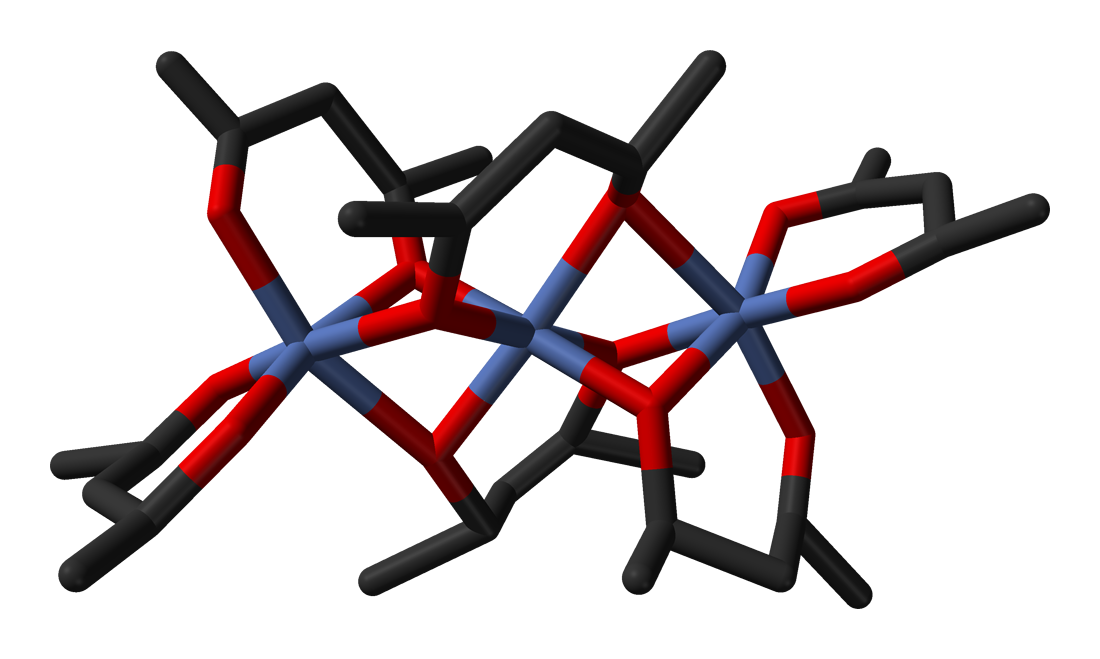
Stick model of [Ni(acac)_{2}]_{3}

Nickel(II) bis(acetylacetonate) exists as the trimetallic complex [Ni(acac)_{2}]_{3}. Bulky beta-diketonates give red, monomeric, square-planar complexes. Nickel(II) bis(acetylacetonate) reacts with water to give the octahedral adduct [Ni(acac)_{2}(H_{2}O)_{2}], a chalky green solid.

In contrast to the complicated magnetism and structures of Ni(acac)_{2}, platinum(II) bis(acetylacetonate) and palladium(II) bis(acetylacetonate) are diamagnetic monometallic species.

=== Copper triad ===
Cu(acac)_{2} is prepared by treating acetylacetone with aqueous Cu(NH_{3})^{2+}_{4}. It is available commercially, catalyzes coupling and carbene transfer reactions.

Unlike the copper(II) derivative, copper(I) acetylacetonate is an air-sensitive oligomeric species. It is employed to catalyze Michael additions.

=== Zinc triad ===
The monoaquo complex Zn(acac)_{2}H_{2}O (m.p. 138–140 °C) is pentacoordinate, adopting a square pyramidal structure. The complex is of some use in organic synthesis. Dehydration of this species gives the hygroscopic anhydrous derivative (m.p. 127 °C). This more volatile derivative has been used as a precursor to films of ZnO.

== Acetylacetonates of the other elements ==
Colourless aluminium acetylacetonate (Al(acac)_{3}) is structurally similar to other tris complexes, e.g. [Fe(acac)_{3}]. The trisacetylacetonates of the lanthanides often adopt coordination numbers above 8.

== Variants of acac ==
Many variants of acetylacetonates are well developed. Hexafluoroacetylacetonates and trifluoroacetylacetonates form complexes that are often structurally related to regular acetylacetonates, but are more Lewis acidic and more volatile. The complex Eufod, Eu(OCC(CH_{3})_{3}CHCOC_{3}F_{7})_{3}, features an elaborate partially fluorinated ligand. This complex is a Lewis acid, forming adducts with a variety of hard bases.

One or both oxygen centers in acetylacetonate can be replaced by RN groups, giving rise to Nacac and Nacnac ligands. Replacement of the oxygen atoms with sulfur gives transition metal dithioacetylacetonates.

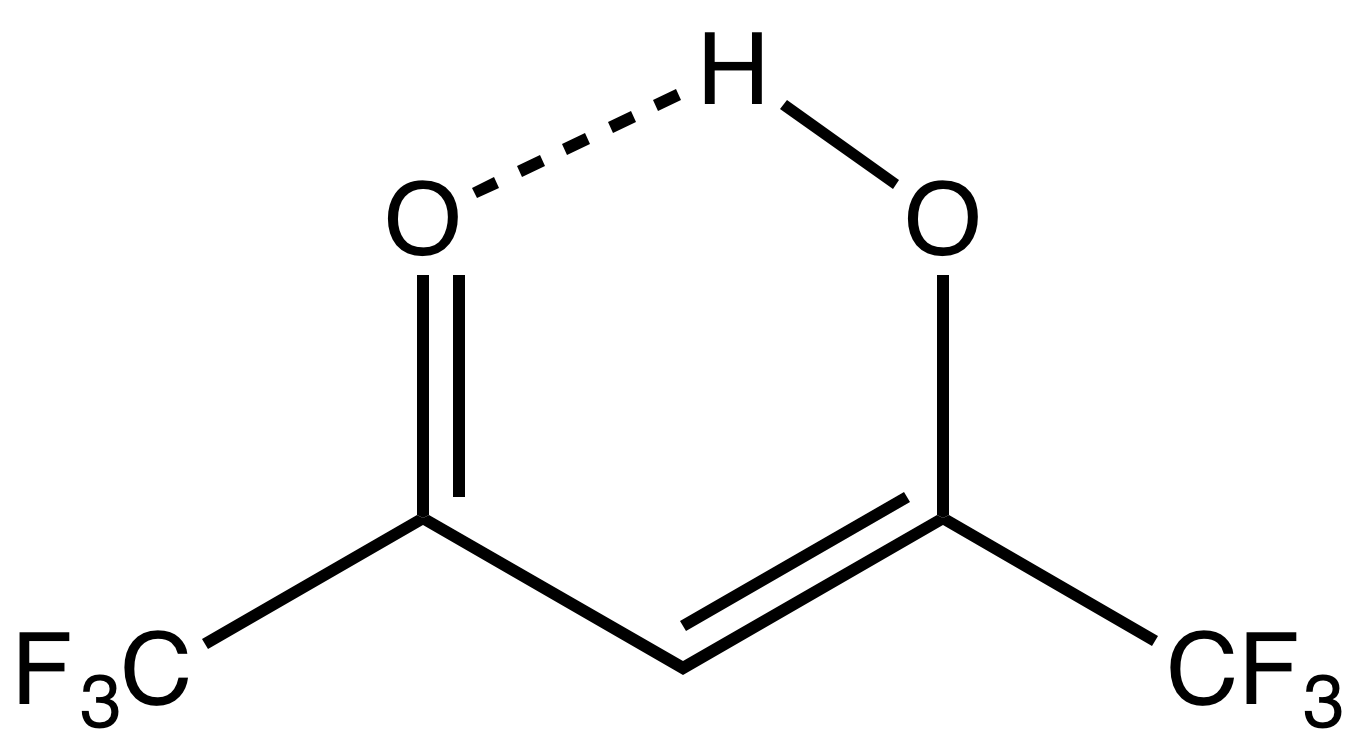
hexafluoroacetylacetone

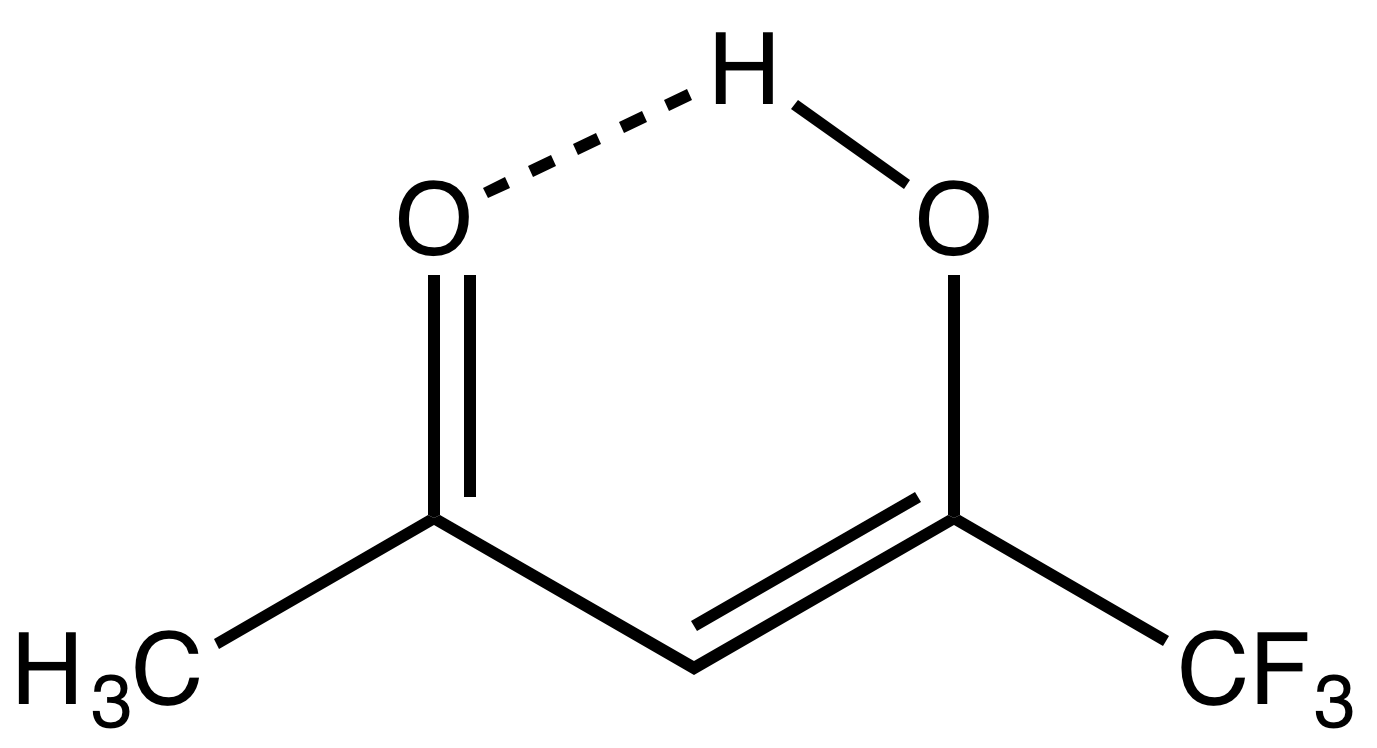
trifluoroacetylacetone

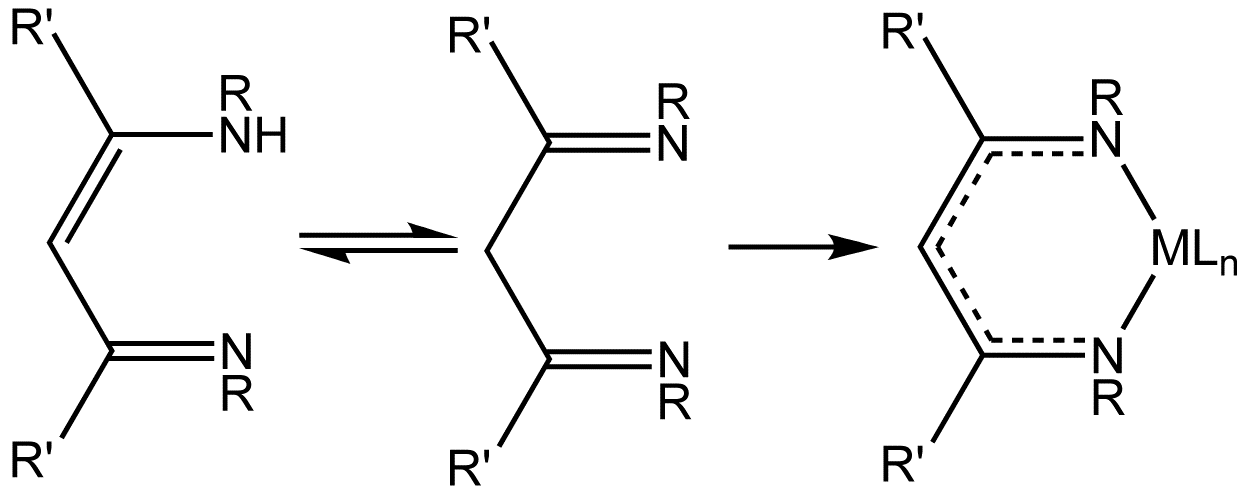
Tautomers and complexation of Nacnac

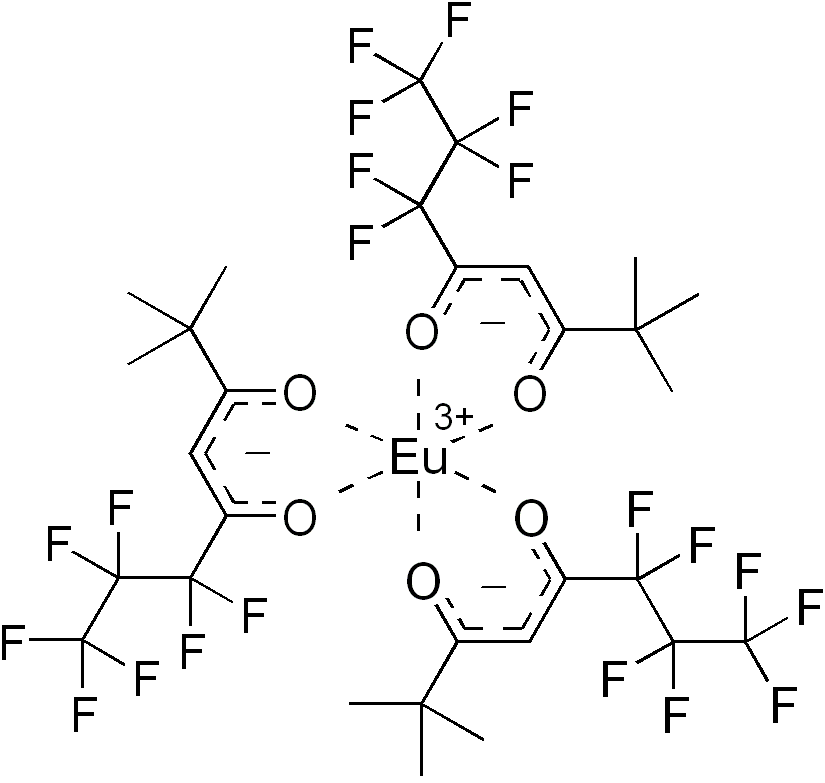
The "NMR shift reagent" Eufod

Tetraacetylethane, which forms bimetallic complexes

Triacetylmethane

2,4,6-Heptanetrione, a binucleating ligand.

== C-bonded acetylacetonates ==
C_{5}H_{7}O^{−}_{2} in some cases also binds to metals through the central carbon atom (C3); this bonding mode is more common for the third-row transition metals such as platinum(II) and iridium(III). The complexes Ir(acac)_{3} and corresponding Lewis-base adducts Ir(acac)_{3}L (L = an amine) contain one carbon-bonded acac ligand. The IR spectra of O-bonded acetylacetonates are characterized by relatively low-energy ν_{CO} bands of 1535 cm^{−1}, whereas in carbon-bonded acetylacetonates, the carbonyl vibration occurs closer to the normal range for ketonic C=O, i.e. 1655 cm^{−1}.
