= Phosphatrioxa-adamantane =

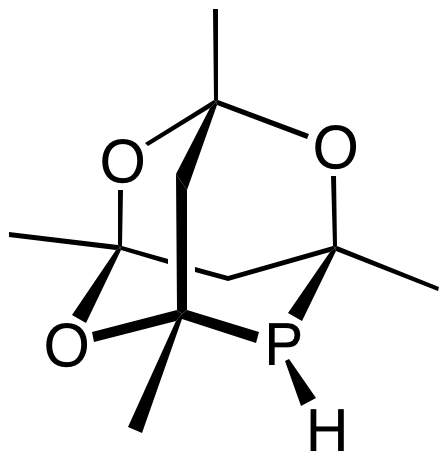

Names
- Other names 1,3,5,7-tetramethyl-2,4,6-Trioxa-8-phosphatricyclo[3.3.1.1^{3,7}]decane

Identifiers
CAS Number	26088-25-5
3D model (JSmol)	Interactive image
ChemSpider	59759745
PubChem CID	102407854; 22121380
- InChI: InChI=1S/C10H17O3P/c1-7-5-9(3)13-8(2,11-7)6-10(4,12-7)14-9/h14H,5-6H2,1-4H3/t7-,8-,9+,10+/m1/s1 Key: DSYQHWPNJZFRCU-IMSYWVGJSA-N
- SMILES: C[C@@]12C[C@]3(O[C@@](O1)(C[C@@](O2)(P3)C)C)C

Properties
Chemical formula	C_{10}H_{17}O_{3}P
Appearance	white solid
- Except where otherwise noted, data are given for materials in their standard state (at 25 °C [77 °F], 100 kPa). Infobox references

Phosphatrioxa-adamantane is an organophosphorus compound that is used as a precursor to bulky phosphine ligands. Abbreviated CgPH (for cage phosphine), it is a white solid.

The compound is prepared by the condensation of two equivalents of acetylacetone and phosphine:

PH_{3} + 2 CH_{3}C(O)CH_{2}C(O)CH_{3} → HP(CH_{3}CCH_{2}CCH_{3})_{2}O_{3} + H_{2}O

The condensation is sometimes called the Buckler–Epstein reaction. Many diketones can be employed in place of acetylacetone. The P-H bond can be further derivatized, leading to a range of tertiary phosphines of potential value in homogeneous catalysis.
