= Dicarbonyl =

Molecule containing two adjacent C=O groups

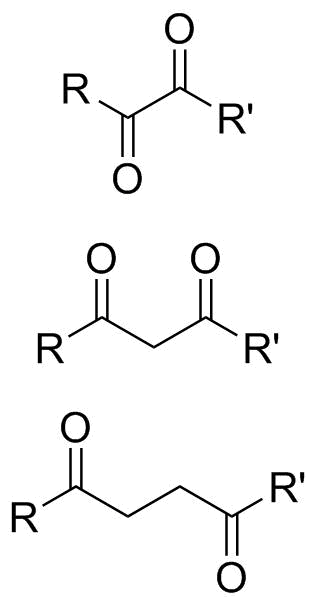
General structure of 1,2-, 1,3-, and 1,4-dicarbonyls

In organic chemistry, a dicarbonyl is a molecule containing two carbonyl (C=O) groups. Although this term could refer to any organic compound containing two carbonyl groups, it is used more specifically to describe molecules in which both carbonyls are in close enough proximity that their reactivity is changed, such as 1,2-, 1,3-, and 1,4-dicarbonyls. Their properties often differ from those of monocarbonyls, and so they are usually considered functional groups of their own. These compounds can have symmetrical or unsymmetrical substituents on each carbonyl, and may also be functionally symmetrical (dialdehydes, diketones, diesters, etc.) or unsymmetrical (keto-esters, keto-acids, etc.).

== 1,2-Dicarbonyls ==
=== 1,2-Dialdehyde ===
The only 1,2-dialdehyde is glyoxal, (CHO)_{2}. Like many alkyldialdehydes, glyoxal is encountered almost exclusively as its hydrate and oligomers thereof. These derivatives often behave equivalently to the aldehydes since hydration is reversible. Glyoxal condenses readily with amines. Via such reactions, it is a precursor to many heterocycles, e.g. imidazoles.

Diacetyl, the simplest diketone

=== 1,2-Diketones ===
The principal diketone is diacetyl, also known as 2,3-butanedione, CH_{3}C(O)C(O)CH_{3}. 1,2-Diketones are often generated by oxidation (dehydrogenation) of the diols:

$$\ce{RCH(OH)CH(OH)R -> RC(O)C(O)R + 2 H2}$$

2,3-Butanedione, 2,3-pentanedione, and 2,3-hexanedione are found in small amounts in various foods. They are used as aroma components in alcohol-free beverages and in baked goods. Benzil, (PhCO)_{2}, is the corresponding diphenyl derivative.

ortho-Quinone, C_{4}H_{4}(CO)_{2}, is the parent of a large family of 1,2-diketones.

A distinctive feature of 1,2-diketones is the long C-C bond linking the carbonyl groups. This bond distance is about 1.54 Å, compared to 1.45 Å for the corresponding bond in 1,3-butadiene. The effect is attributed to repulsion between the partial positive charges of the carbonyl carbon atoms.

1,2-Diketones condense with many bifunctional nucleophiles, such as urea and thiourea to give heterocycles. Condensation with aromatic amines gives diimines of the form ((RC=NAr)_{2}), common for transition metal catalysis. If at least one ketone is not enolizable, then the diketone can undergo a Cannizzaro-like disproportionation in base, the benzilic acid rearrangement.

In the cases of 1,2-cyclohexanedione and 1,2-cyclopentanedione, the enol is about 1-3 kcal/mol more stable than the diketo form.

=== 1,2-Ketoaldehydes ===
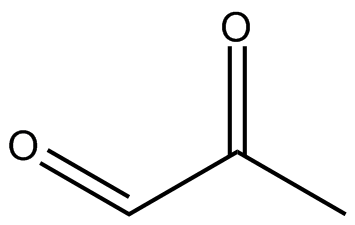
Methylglyoxal, a well-known 2-oxoaldehyde

A well-known compound of this class is methylglyoxal, CH_{3}C(O)CHO, also known as pyruvaldehyde. These compounds are also known as 2-oxoaldehydes or α-ketoaldehydes.

=== 1,2-Diesters and diacids ===
Oxalic acid and its esters define this family of compounds. The diacid is produced industrially by oxidation of waste sugars. It occurs naturally (as the conjugate base), notably in members of the plant species Oxalis. Condensation of the diesters with diamines gives cyclic diamides.

=== α-Keto- and formylcarboxylic acids ===
Important keto-acids: pyruvic acid (top), acetoacetic acid, and levulinic acid (bottom).

α-Keto-acids and -esters are well known. Pyruvic acid (CH_{3}C(O)CO_{2}H) is the parent α-ketoacid. Its conjugate base, pyruvate (CH_{3}C(O)CO^{−}_{2}), is a component of the citric acid cycle and product of glucose metabolism (glycolysis). The corresponding aldehyde-acid is glyoxalic acid (HC(O)CO_{2}H).

== 1,3-Dicarbonyls ==
=== 1,3-Dialdehydes ===
The parent 1,3-dialdehyde is malondialdehyde (CH_{2}(CHO)_{2}), a β-dicarbonyl. Like most dialdehydes, it is rarely encountered as such. Instead it is handled almost exclusively as its hydrate, methyl acetal, and oligomers thereof. These derivatives often behave like the parent. Many 2-substituted derivatives are known. They are often prepared by alkylation of the enolate of malondialdehyde.

=== 1,3-Diketones ===
1,3-Diketones are also called β-diketones. An important member is acetylacetone, CH_{3}C(O)CH_{2}C(O)CH_{3}. Dimedone is a cyclic 1,3-diketone. 1,3-Indandione is the cyclic 1,3-diketone fused to a benzene ring. Acetylacetone is prepared industrially by the thermal rearrangement of isopropenylacetate. Another cyclic 1,3-diketone is 2,2,4,4-tetramethylcyclobutanedione, which is a precursor to a useful diol.

$$\ce{CH2(CH3)COC(O)Me -> MeC(O)CH2C(O)Me}$$

1,3-Diketones often tautomerize to an enol and ketol. The percent enol in acetylacetone, trifluoroacetylacetone, and hexafluoroacetylacetone are 85, 97, and 100%, respectively (neat, 33 °C). Cyclic 1,3-diketones, such as 1,3-cyclohexanedione and dimedone, similarly exist significantly in the enol form.

Like other diketones, 1,3-diketones are versatile precursors to heterocycles. The conjugate bases derived from 1,3-ketones, 1,3-diketonates, can serve as ligands to form metal acetylacetonate coordination complexes. In the DeMayo reaction 1,3-diketones react with alkenes in a photochemical pericyclic reaction to form (substituted) 1,5-diketones.

Classically, 1,3-diketones are prepared by the Claisen condensation of a ketone with an ester.

=== 1,3-Diesters and diacids ===
Malonic acid and its esters are the parent members of this class of dicarbonyls. Also common are the 2-substituted derivatives with the formula RCH(CO_{2}R)_{2}, which arise by C-alkylation of the conjugate base (the enolate) NaCH(CO_{2}R)_{2}.

=== β-Keto-esters ===
β-Keto-esters arise readily by the condensation of a pair of esters. A well known example is ethyl acetoacetate (although it is prepared by ethanolysis of ketene).

== 1,4-Dicarbonyls ==
=== 1,4-Dialdehydes ===
Succinaldehyde (CH_{2}CHO)_{2} is the simplest and parent 1,4-dialdehyde. The aromatic derivative is phthalaldehyde.

=== 1,4-Diketones ===
1,4-Benzoquinone is a cyclic 1,4-doubly unsaturated diketone.

Diketones with two methylene groups separating the carbonyl groups, also called γ-diketones, typically coexist with their enol tautomers. The preeminent member is acetonylacetone. 1,4-Diketones are useful precursors to heterocycles via the Paal–Knorr synthesis, which gives pyrroles:

This reactivity is the basis of the neurotoxicity of γ-diketones. 1,4-Diketones are also precursor to furans and thiophenes. The condensation of 1,4-diketones (and related substrates) with hydrazines afford dihydropyridazines, which can be converted to pyridazines.

Conversely, some families of unsaturated 1,4-diketones arise from aromatic precursors. para-quinone, C_{4}H_{4}(CO)_{2}, is the parent of a large family of 1,4-diketones. Likewise certain furans undergo the reverse of the Paal-Knorr reaction in the Achmatowicz oxidation.

=== 1,4-Diesters and diacids ===
Succinic acid and its esters are the parent members of this family of 1,4-dicarbonyls. Succinic acid is notable as a component in the citric acid cycle. It forms a cyclic acid anhydride, succinic anhydride. Unsaturated members include maleic and fumaric acids and their esters.

== 1,5-Dicarbonyls ==
=== 1,5-Dialdehydes ===
Glutaraldehyde (CH_{2})_{3}(CHO)_{2} is the simplest and parent 1,5-dialdehyde. It hydrates readily. The aromatic analogue is isophthalaldehyde.

=== 1,5-Diketones ===
These diketones have three methylene groups separating the carbonyl groups.

=== 1,5-Diesters and diacids ===
Glutaric acid (CH_{2})_{3}(CO_{2}H)_{2} is the parent 1,5-diacid.

== Hydration and cyclization ==
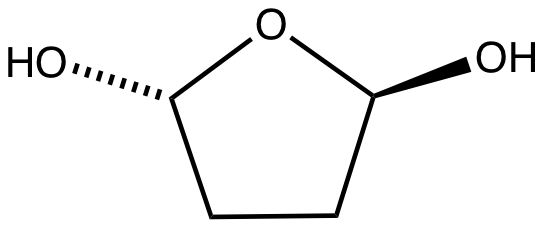
2,5-Dihydroxytetrahydrofuran, the hydrated form of succinaldehyde.

Small aldehydes tend to hydrate. Hydration is prevalent for dialdehydes. Glyoxal forms a series of cyclic hydrates. Succinaldehyde hydrates readily to give 2,5-dihydroxytetrahydrofuran. The aromatic phthalaldehyde also forms hydrated.

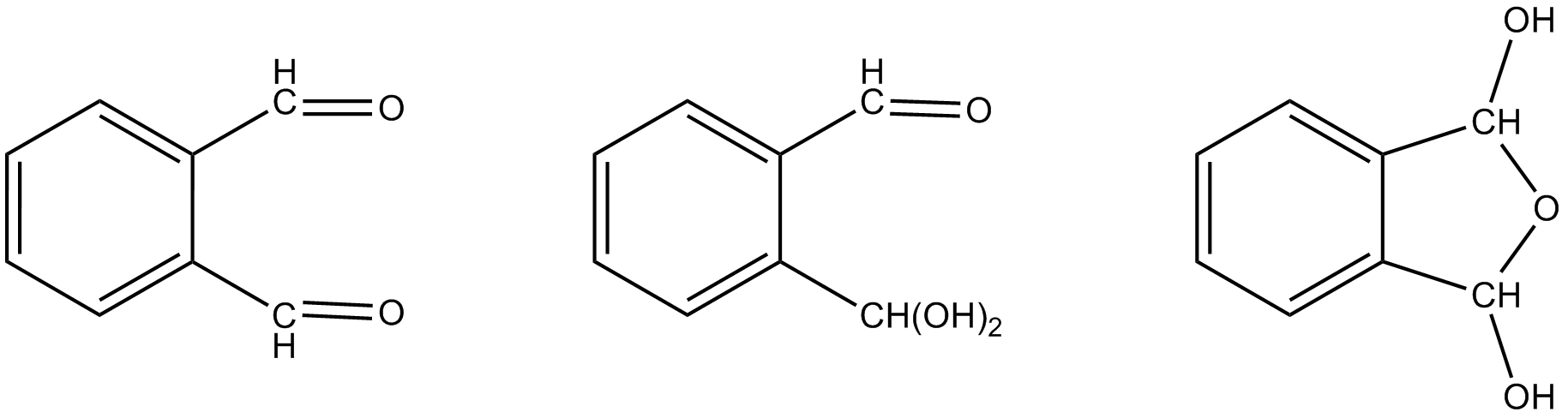

Similar hydration and cyclization equilibria apply to maleic dialdehyde, glutaraldehyde, and adipaldehyde.

== Safety ==
A number of dicarbonyl compounds are bioactive. Diacetyl is known to cause the lung disease bronchiolitis obliterans in those individuals exposed to it in an occupational setting. Dialdehydes, e.g. glutaraldehyde and malonaldehyde, are fixatives or sterilizers.

== See also ==
- Triketone
