= Hafnium acetylacetonate =

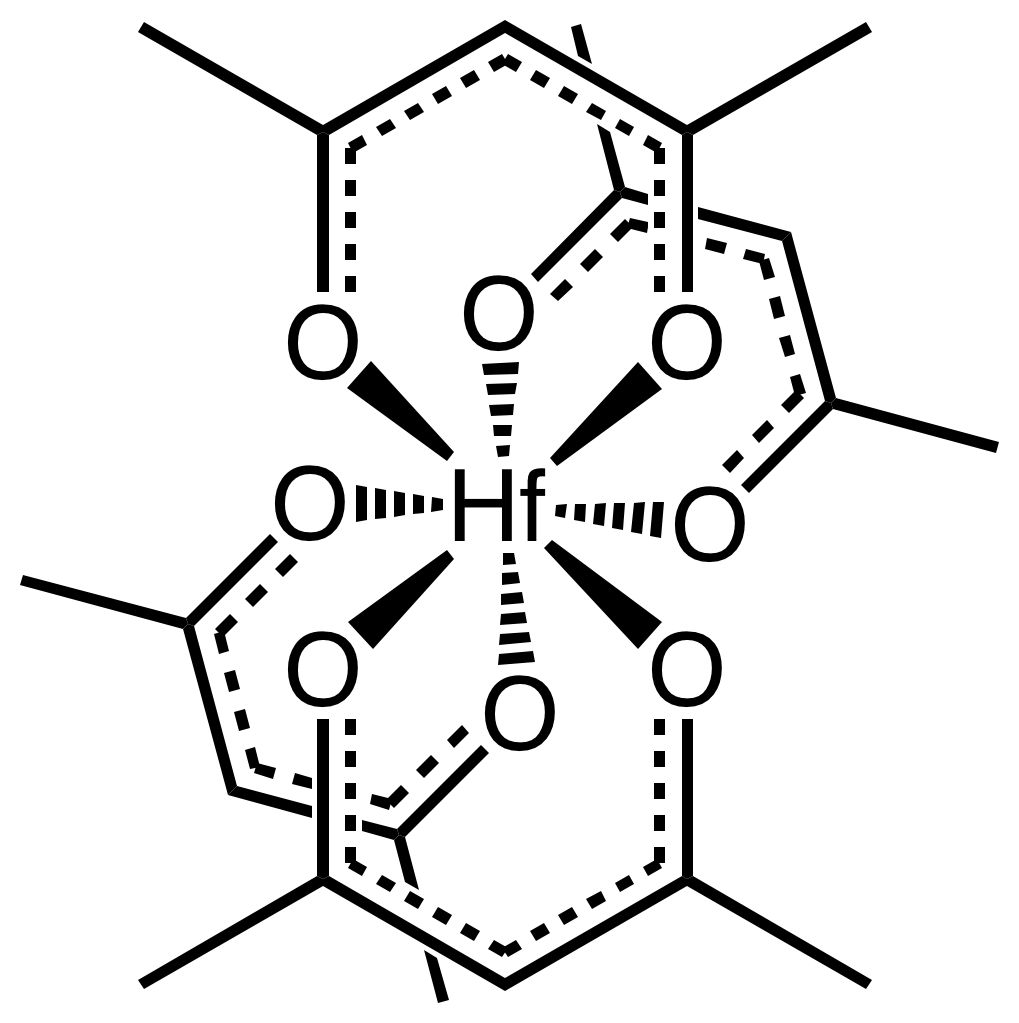

Names
- IUPAC name Tetrakis(acetylacetonato)hafnium(IV)
- Systematic IUPAC name Tetrakis[(Z)-4-oxopent-2-en-2-olato-κ^{2}O,O′]hafnium(IV)
- Other names tetrakis(acetylacetonato)hafnium, hafnium tetrakis(acetylacetonate)

Identifiers
CAS Number	17475-67-1
3D model (JSmol)	Interactive image
ChemSpider	10709311
EC Number	681-372-7
PubChem CID	21953595
- InChI: InChI=1S/4C5H8O2.Hf/c4*1-4(6)3-5(2)7;/h4*3,6H,1-2H3;/q;;;;+4/p-4/b4*4-3-; Key: MCFIMQJAFAOJPD-MTOQALJVSA-J
- SMILES: [Hf+4].O=C(C)\C=C(/[O-])C.[O-]\C(C)=C/C(C)=O.[O-]\C(C)=C/C(C)=O.[O-]\C(C)=C/C(C)=O

Properties
Chemical formula	C_{20}H_{28}HfO_{8}
Molar mass	574.93 g·mol^{−1}
Appearance	White to off-white powder
Density	1.42 g/cm^{3}
Melting point	193 °C (379 °F; 466 K) (decomposes)
Solubility in benzene	good
- Except where otherwise noted, data are given for materials in their standard state (at 25 °C [77 °F], 100 kPa). Infobox references

Hafnium acetylacetonate, also known as Hf(acac)_{4}, is a coordination compound with formula Hf(C_{5}H_{7}O_{2})_{4}. This white solid is the main hafnium complex of acetylacetonate. The complex has a square antiprismatic geometry with eight nearly equivalent Hf-O bonds. The molecular symmetry is D_{2}, i.e., the complex is chiral. It is prepared from hafnium tetrachloride and acetylacetone, and base. Zr(acac)_{4} is very similar in structure and properties.

== Uses ==
Along with titanium tetrabutoxide (TBT), hafnium acetylacetonate serves as a catalyst for the production of poly(butylene terephthalate).

== Related compounds ==
- Tetrakis(1,1,1-trifluoro-2,4-pentanedionato)hafnium
