= Rhodium acetylacetonate =

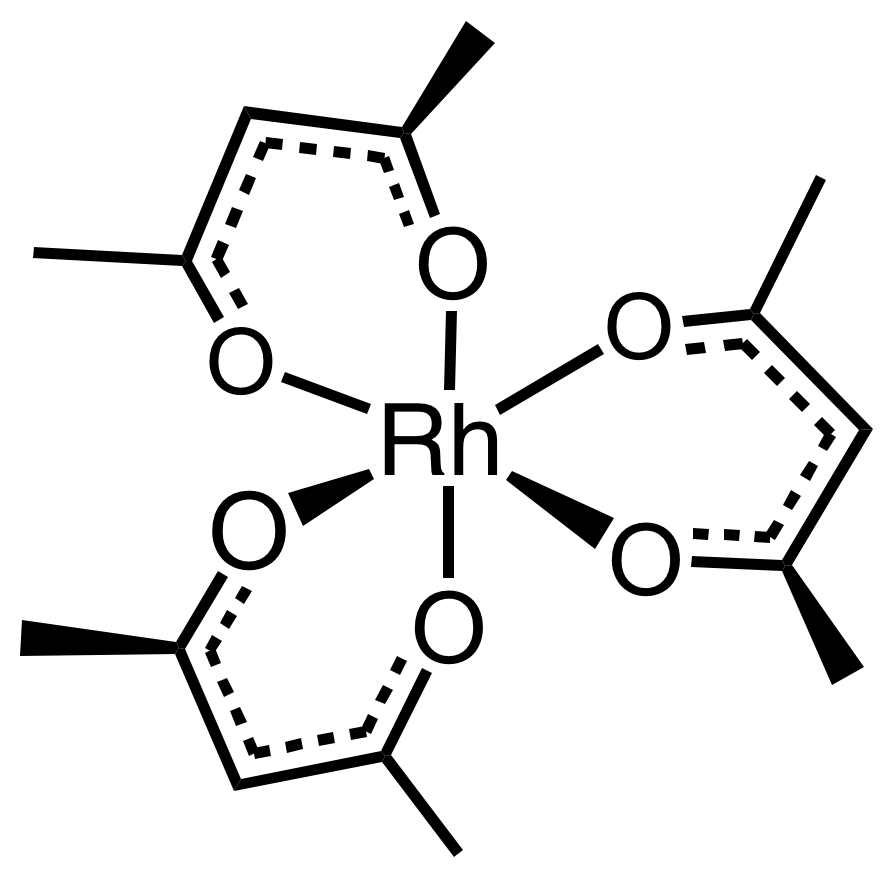

Names
- IUPAC name Tris(acetylacetonato)rhodium(III)
- Systematic IUPAC name Tris[(Z)-4-oxopent-2-en-2-olato-κ^{2}O,O′]rhodium(III)
- Other names Rhodium(III) acetylacetonate

Identifiers
| CAS Number | 14284-92-5 |
| 3D model (JSmol) | coordination form: Interactive image; ionic form: Interactive image |
| ECHA InfoCard | 100.034.704 |
| EC Number | 238-192-5 |
| PubChem CID | 73187452 |
| CompTox Dashboard (EPA) | DTXSID50931658 |
- InChI: InChI=1S/3C5H8O2.Rh/c3*1-4(6)3-5(2)7;/h3*3,6H,1-2H3;/b3*4-3+; Key: MBVAQOHBPXKYMF-MUCWUPSWSA-N
- SMILES: coordination form: CC(=C[C-](C)O1)O[Rh+3]123(OC(=C[C-](C)O2)C)OC(=C[C-](C)O3)C; ionic form: CC(=O)C=C(C)[O-].CC(=O)C=C(C)[O-].CC(=O)C=C(C)[O-].[Rh+3]

Properties
| Chemical formula | C_{15}H_{21}O_{6}Rh |
| Molar mass | 400.232 g·mol^{−1} |
| Appearance | orange solid |
| Melting point | 260 °C (500 °F; 533 K) (decomposes) |

Hazards
- GHS labelling
| Pictograms | (GHS07: Exclamation mark) (GHS08: Health hazard) |
| Signal word | Warning |
| Hazard statements | H302, H312, H315, H319, H332, H335, H361 |
| Precautionary statements | P201, P202, P261, P264, P270, P271, P280, P281, P301+P312, P302+P352, P304+P312, P304+P340, P305+P351+P338, P308+P313, P312, P321, P322, P330, P332+P313, P337+P313, P362, P363, P403+P233, P405, P501 |
- Except where otherwise noted, data are given for materials in their standard state (at 25 °C [77 °F], 100 kPa). Infobox references

Rhodium acetylacetonate is the coordination complex with the formula Rh(C_{5}H_{7}O_{2})_{3}, which is sometimes known as Rh(acac)_{3}. The molecule has D_{3}-symmetry. It is a yellow-orange solid that is soluble in organic solvents.

It is prepared from RhCl_{3}(H_{2}O)_{3} and acetylacetone. The complex has been resolved into individual enantiomers by separation of its adduct with dibenzoyltartaric acid.

== Related compounds ==
- Dicarbonyl(acetylacetonato)rhodium(I), Rh(C_{5}H_{7}O_{2})(CO)_{2}
- Iridium acetylacetonate, Ir(C_{5}H_{7}O_{2})_{3}
