= Zirconium acetylacetonate =

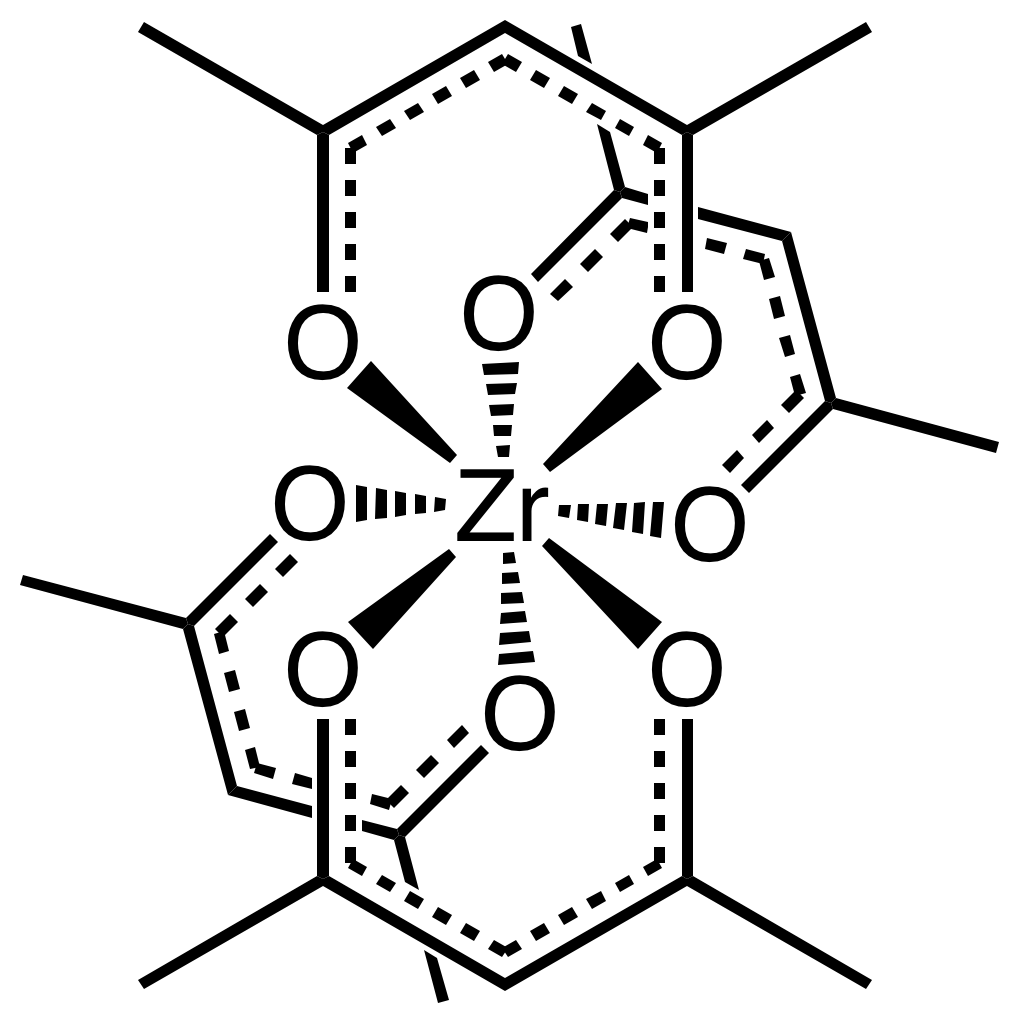

Names
- IUPAC name Tetrakis(acetylacetonato)zirconium(IV)
- Systematic IUPAC name Tetrakis[(Z)-4-oxopent-2-en-2-olato-κ^{2}O,O′]zirconium(IV)
- Other names tetrakis(acetylacetonato)zirconium, zirconium tetraacetylacetonate, zirconium tetrakis(acetylacetonate), tetrakis(acetylacetonato) zirconium, Zirconium(IV) 2,4-pentanedionate

Identifiers
CAS Number	17501-44-9
3D model (JSmol)	Interactive image
ChemSpider	4576440
ECHA InfoCard	100.037.721
EC Number	241-510-5
PubChem CID	11134693
UNII	15NW5BA32K
CompTox Dashboard (EPA)	DTXSID00904296
- InChI: InChI=1S/4C5H8O2.Zr/c4*1-4(6)3-5(2)7;/h4*3,6H,1-2H3;/b4*4-3-; Key: YOBOXHGSEJBUPB-MTOQALJVSA-N
- SMILES: CC(=CC(=O)C)O.CC(=CC(=O)C)O.CC(=CC(=O)C)O.CC(=CC(=O)C)O.[Zr]

Properties
Chemical formula	C_{20}H_{28}O_{8}Zr
Molar mass	487.660 g·mol^{−1}
Appearance	white solid
Density	1.419 g/cm^{3}
Melting point	194–195 °C (381–383 °F; 467–468 K)
Sublimation conditions	140 °C in vacuo
Solubility in benzene	200 g/L

Hazards
- GHS labelling
Pictograms	(GHS07: Exclamation mark)
Signal word	Warning
Hazard statements	H302, H312, H315, H319, H332, H335
Precautionary statements	P261, P264, P270, P271, P280, P301+P312, P302+P352, P304+P312, P304+P340, P305+P351+P338, P312, P321, P322, P330, P332+P313, P337+P313, P362, P363, P403+P233, P405, P501
- Except where otherwise noted, data are given for materials in their standard state (at 25 °C [77 °F], 100 kPa). Infobox references

Zirconium acetylacetonate is the coordination complex with the formula Zr(C_{5}H_{7}O_{2})_{4}. It is a common acetylacetonate of zirconium. It is a white solid that exhibits high solubility in nonpolar organic solvents, but not simple hydrocarbons.

The complex is prepared by treating zirconium oxychloride with acetylacetone:

ZrOCl_{2} + 4 Hacac → Zr(acac)_{4} + 2 HCl + H_{2}O

The complex has a square antiprismatic geometry with eight nearly equivalent Zr-O bonds of length 2.19 Å. The molecular symmetry is D_{2}, i.e. the complex is chiral. Compounds of high coordination number tend to be stereochemically nonrigid as indicated by the observation of one methyl signal by proton NMR spectroscopy.

More volatile than Zr(acac)_{4} is the related complex of 1,1,1-trifluoroacetylacetonate.
