= Tris(acetylacetonato)titanium(III) =

Names
- IUPAC name Tris(acetylacetonato)titanium(III)
- Systematic IUPAC name Tris[(Z)-4-oxopent-2-en-2-olato-κ^{2}O,O′]titanium(III)
- Other names tris(2,4-pentanedionato)titanium, titanium trisacetylacetonate

Identifiers
CAS Number	14284-96-9
3D model (JSmol)	Interactive image
ChemSpider	76066
ECHA InfoCard	100.034.708
EC Number	238-196-7
PubChem CID	84322
CompTox Dashboard (EPA)	DTXSID20931660
- InChI: InChI=1S/3C5H8O2.Ti/c3*1-4(6)3-5(2)7;/h3*3,6H,1-2H3;/q;;;+3/p-3 Key: SYIKXNDVCPYCLG-UHFFFAOYSA-K
- SMILES: CC(=CC(=O)C)[O-].CC(=CC(=O)C)[O-].CC(=CC(=O)C)[O-].[Ti+3]

Properties
Chemical formula	C_{15}H_{21}O_{6}Ti
Molar mass	345.194 g·mol^{−1}
Appearance	blue solid
Density	1.366 g/cm^{3}
- Except where otherwise noted, data are given for materials in their standard state (at 25 °C [77 °F], 100 kPa). Infobox references

Tris(acetylacetonato)titanium(III), often abbreviated Ti(acac)_{3}, is a coordination complex of titanium(III) featuring acetylacetonate (acac) ligands, making it one of a family of metal acetylacetonates. It is a blue air-sensitive solid that dissolves in nonpolar organic solvents. The compound is prepared by treating titanium trichloride with acetylacetone in the presence of base. Being paramagnetic, it gives a contact-shifted proton NMR signal at 60 ppm upfield of TMS assigned to the methyl group.

== Structure ==
It is an octahedral complex. The Ti-O bonds lengths range from 2.023 to 2.013 Å, the large variation being attributed to the Jahn-Teller effect. Ti(acac)_{3} possesses helical chirality, giving rise to Δ- and Λ-enantiomers.

It is a precatalyst for Ziegler-Natta catalysis.
