= NacNac =

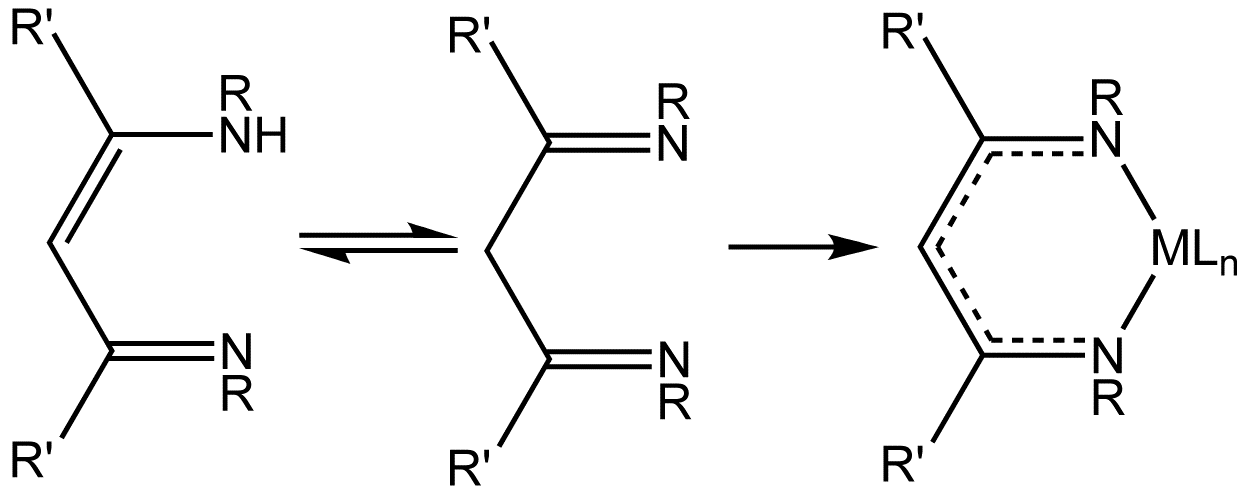
Tautomers of a substituted HNacNac ligand precursor and an idealized complex (right) of the conjugate base (M = metal, L = other ligand)

NacNac is a class of anionic bidentate ligands. 1,3-Diketimines are often referred to as "HNacNac", a modification of the abbreviation Hacac used for 1,3-diketones. These species can exist as a mixture of tautomers.

== Preparation of ligands and complexes ==
Acetylacetone and related 1,3-diketones condense with primary alkyl- or arylamines resulting in replacement of the carbonyl oxygen atoms with NR groups, where R = aryl, alkyl. To prepare 1,3-diketimines from bulky amines, e.g. 2,4,6-trimethylanilines, prolonged reaction times are required. 2,6-Diisopropylaniline is a common bulky building block.

Deprotonation of HNacNac compounds affords anionic bidentate ligands that form a variety of coordination complexes. Some derivatives with large R groups can be used to stabilize low valent main group and transition metal complexes. Unlike the situation for the acetylacetonates, the steric properties of the coordinating atoms in NacNac^{−} ligands is adjustable by changes in the R substituent. Attachment to a metal center is usually carried out by initial deprotonation of HNacNac with n-butyllithium; the lithium derivative is then treated with a metal chloride to eliminate lithium chloride. In some cases, HNacNacs also serve as charge-neutral 1,3-diimine ligands.

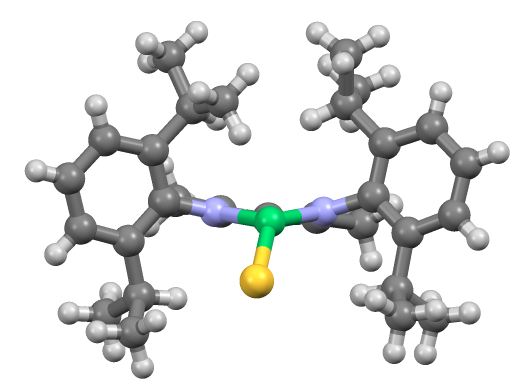
Structure of [(C_{6}H_{3}-2,6-(i-Pr)_{2})_{2}NacNac]NiSCPh_{3} viewed down the C_{2} axis, illustrating the steric bulk of this NacNac ligand (CPh_{3} removed for clarity). Color code=gray = C, white = H, blue=N, yellow=S, green=Ni).

== Related NacNac ligands ==
Synthesis of Jäger's N_{2}O_{2} ligand.

NacNac ligands are diimine analogues of acetylacetonate ligands. An intermediate class of ligands are derived from monoimino-ketones.

== See also ==
- Diimine
