= Copper(II) acetylacetonate =

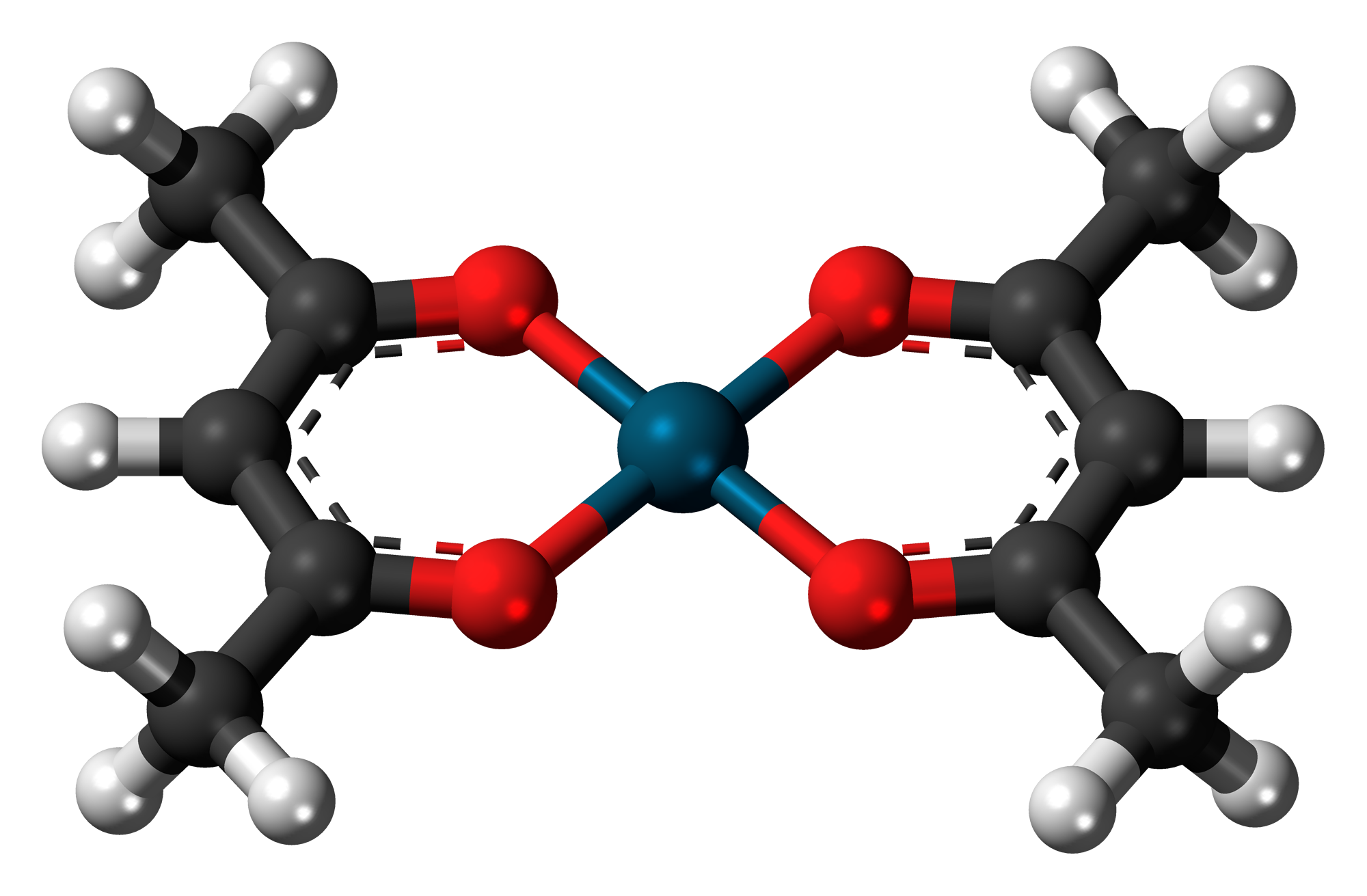

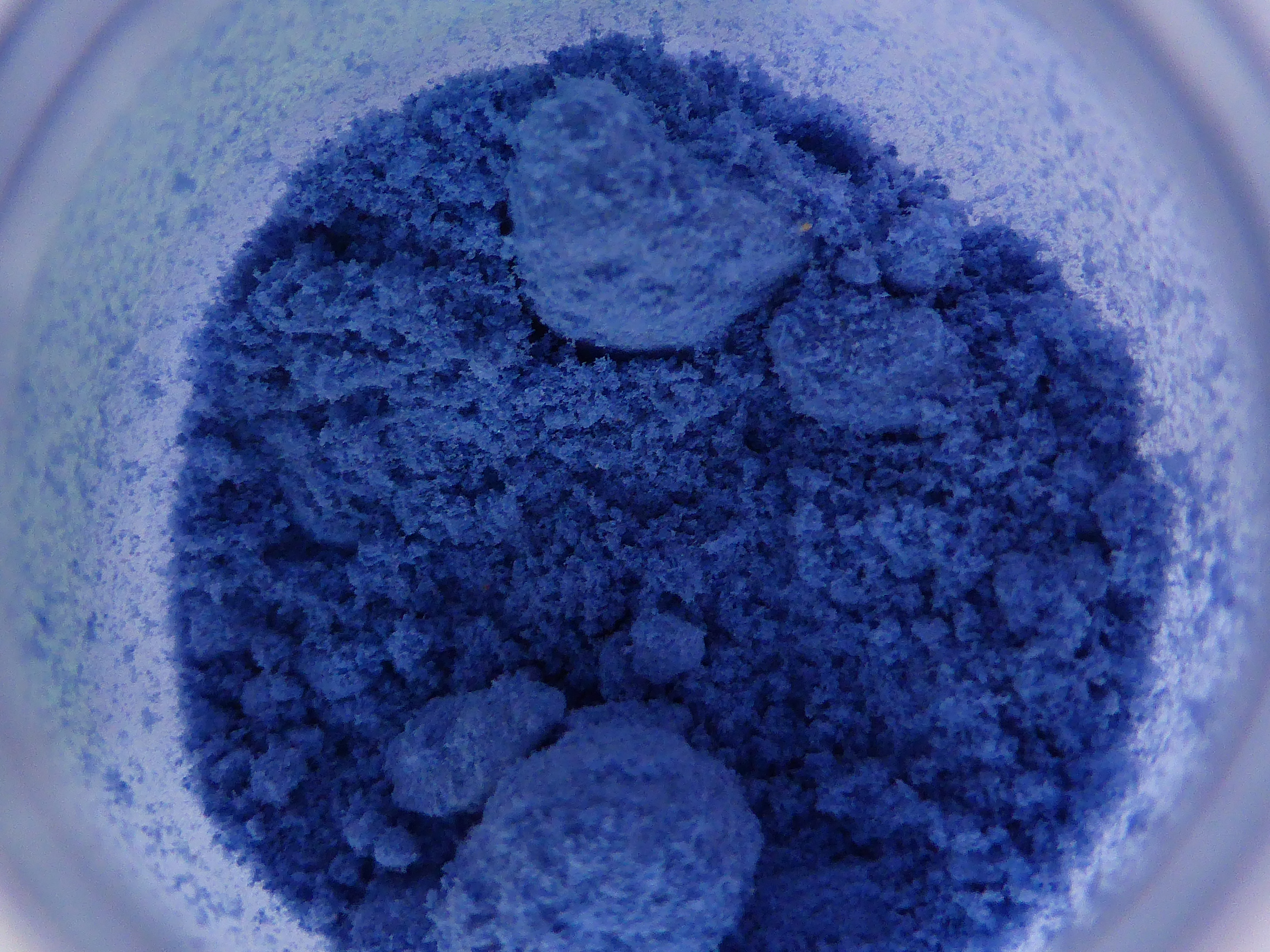

Names
- IUPAC name Bis(acetylacetonato)copper(II)
- Systematic IUPAC name Bis[(Z)-4-oxopent-2-en-2-olato-κ^{2}O,O′]copper(II)
- Other names: Bis(2,4-pentanedionato)copper; Cupric acetylacetonate

Identifiers
CAS Number	13395-16-9
3D model (JSmol)	Interactive image
ChemSpider	17949957
ECHA InfoCard	100.033.147
EC Number	236-477-9
PubChem CID	139053110
UNII	69QQY9TJ8M
CompTox Dashboard (EPA)	DTXSID50904281
- InChI: InChI=1S/2C5H8O2.Cu/c2*1-4(6)3-5(2)7;/h2*3,6H,1-2H3; Key: ZKXWKVVCCTZOLD-UHFFFAOYSA-N
- SMILES: CC(=CC(=O)C)O.CC(=CC(=O)C)O.[Cu]

Properties
Chemical formula	Cu(C_{5}H_{7}O_{2})_{2}
Molar mass	261.764 g·mol^{−1}
Appearance	blue solid
Density	0.721 g/cm^{3}
Melting point	245 °C (473 °F; 518 K) (decomposes)
Boiling point	160 °C (320 °F; 433 K) at 9.8 mmHg
Vapor pressure	0.13 hPa at 163 °C (325 °F; 436 K)

Hazards
- GHS labelling
Pictograms	(GHS07: Exclamation mark)
Signal word	Warning
Hazard statements	H315, H319, H335
Precautionary statements	P261, P264, P271, P280, P302+P352, P304+P340+P312, P305+P351+P338, P332+P313, P337+P313, P362, P403+P233, P405, P501
NFPA 704 (fire diamond)	2 1 0
Autoignition temperature	250 °C (482 °F; 523 K)
Threshold limit value (TLV)	1 mg/m^{3} (TWA)
- Lethal dose or concentration (LD, LC)
LD_{50} (median dose)	19 mg/kg (intraperitoneal, mouse); 10 mg/kg (intravenous, mouse)
- NIOSH (US health exposure limits)
REL (Recommended)	1 mg/m^{3} (TWA)
IDLH (Immediate danger)	100 mg/m^{3}
- Except where otherwise noted, data are given for materials in their standard state (at 25 °C [77 °F], 100 kPa). Infobox references

Copper(II) acetylacetonate is the coordination compound with the formula Cu(CH_{3}C(O)CHC(O)CH_{3})_{2}. It is the homoleptic acetylacetonate complex of copper(II). The compound, a bright blue paramagnetic solid, is insoluble in water but dissolves in some organic solvents.

== Structure ==
According to X-ray crystallography and spectra recorded on single crystals, the Cu center is square planar. The flexibility is attributed to the nature of the intermolecular forces. Crystals of exhibit the unusual property of being flexible.

Flexibility of Copper(II) acetylacetonate crystals shown under the microscope.

== Synthesis ==
Copper(II) acetylacetonate may be prepared by reaction of copper(II) salts and acetylacetone in the presence of a base:

CuCl_{2} + 2 CH_{3}C(O)CH_{2}C(O)CH_{3} + 2 NaOH → Cu(CH_{3}C(O)CHC(O)CH_{3})_{2} + 2 NaCl + 2 H_{2}O

== Uses ==
Thermal decomposition of copper(II) acetylacetonate at low pressure and high temperature in a hydrogen / water atmosphere may be used to produce nano-particles of copper(I) oxide (Cu_{2}O) or copper (Cu_{2}) depending on the temperature and pressure parameters.
