= Titanium bis(acetylacetonate)dichloride =

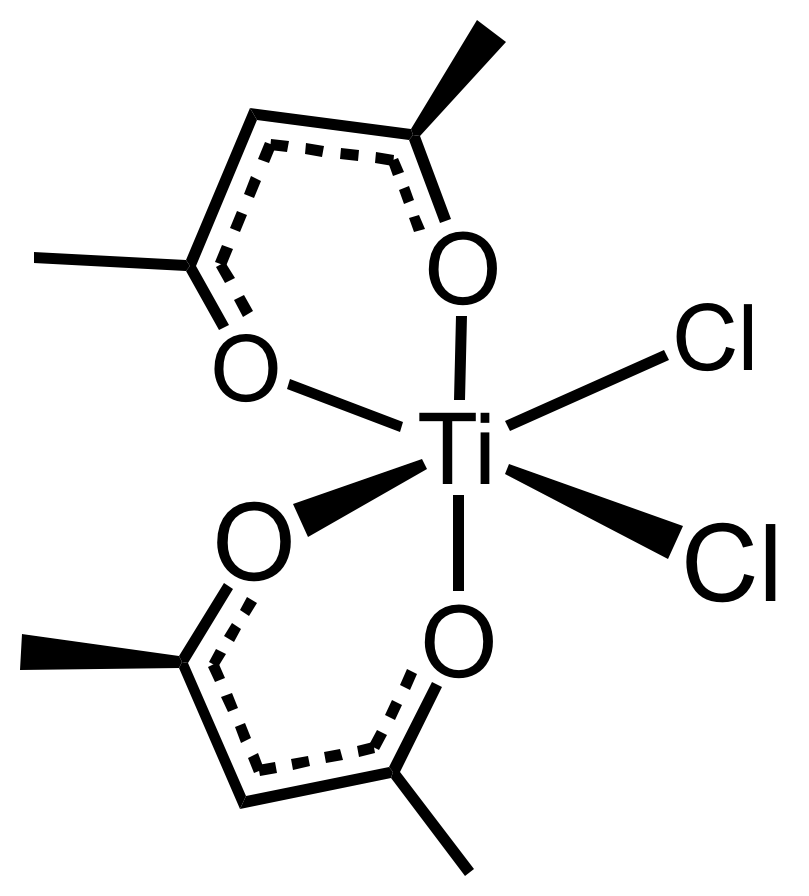

Names
- IUPAC name (OC-6-2′2)-Dichlorido(2,4-dioxopentan-3-ido-κ^{2}O,O′)titanium
- Other names dichlorobis(2,4-pentanedionato)titanium, dichlorobis(2,4-acetylacetonato)titanium, bis(acetylacetonato)dichlorotitanium

Identifiers
CAS Number	17099-86-4
3D model (JSmol)	ionic form: Interactive image; coordination form: Interactive image
ChemSpider	4588323
ECHA InfoCard	100.037.415
EC Number	241-172-9
PubChem CID	5483899
- InChI: InChI=1S/2C5H8O2.2ClH.Ti/c2*1-4(6)3-5(2)7;;;/h2*3,6H,1-2H3;2*1H;/q;;;;+4/p-4/b2*4-3-;;; Key: LUDYOTBRNXNKAB-VGKOASNMSA-J
- SMILES: ionic form: CC(=CC(=O)C)[O-].CC(=CC(=O)C)[O-].[Cl-].[Cl-].[Ti+4]; coordination form: Cl[Ti-2]12(Cl)(OC(C)=CC(C)=[O+]1)OC(C)=CC(C)=[O+]2

Properties
Chemical formula	C_{10}H_{14}Cl_{2}O_{4}Ti
Molar mass	316.99 g·mol^{−1}
Appearance	red-orange solid
Density	1.514 g/cm^{3}
Melting point	191 °C (376 °F; 464 K)
- Except where otherwise noted, data are given for materials in their standard state (at 25 °C [77 °F], 100 kPa). Infobox references

Titanium bis(acetylacetonate)dichloride is the coordination complex with the formula Ti(C_{5}H_{7}O_{2})_{2}Cl_{2}. It is a common acetylacetonate complex of titanium. It is a red-orange solid that hydrolyzes slowly in air.

The complex is prepared by treatment of titanium tetrachloride with excess acetylacetone:

TiCl_{4} + 2 Hacac → Ti(acac)_{2}Cl_{2} + 2 HCl

It is an octahedral complex that crystallizes as a racemic mixture of the chiral cis isomers. It is fluxional in solution, as the result of rapid cis–trans equilibrium.
