= Terbium acetylacetonate =

Names
- IUPAC name Tris(acetylacetonato)terbium(III)
- Systematic IUPAC name Tris[(Z)-4-oxopent-2-en-2-olato-κ^{2}O,O′]terbium(III)

Identifiers
CAS Number	14284-95-8
3D model (JSmol)	Interactive image
PubChem CID	84321
- InChI: InChI=1S/3C5H7O2.Tb/c3*1-4(6)3-5(2)7;/h3*3H,1-2H3;/q3*-1;+3 Key: MAPWZFZLNRMAMO-UHFFFAOYSA-N
- SMILES: CC(=O)[CH-]C(=O)C.CC(=O)[CH-]C(=O)C.CC(=O)[CH-]C(=O)C.[Tb+3]

Properties
Chemical formula	C_{15}H_{21}O_{6}Tb
Molar mass	456.252 g·mol^{−1}
- Except where otherwise noted, data are given for materials in their standard state (at 25 °C [77 °F], 100 kPa). Infobox references

Terbium acetylacetonate is a coordination compound with the formula Tb(C_{5}H_{7}O_{2})_{3}. This anhydrous acetylacetonate complex is often discussed but unlikely to exist per se. The 8-coordinated dihydrate Tb(C_{5}H_{7}O_{2})_{3}(H_{2}O)_{2} is a more plausible formula based on the behavior of other lanthanide acetylacetonates. The dihydrate has been characterized by X-ray crystallography. Upon attempted dehydration by heating under vacuum, other hydrated lanthanide tris(acetylacetonate) complexes decompose to give oxo-clusters. The complex can be prepared from terbium salts, acetylacetone, and a base such as ammonia.

3 NH_{3} + 3 Hacac + Tb(NO_{3})_{3} → Tb(acac)_{3} + 3 NH_{4}NO_{3}

It reacts with 5-[(2-thiophene methylene)amino]-8-hydroxyquinoline (L) by heating in acetonitrile/dichloromethane solution to obtain light yellow [Tb(acac)_{4}(L)_{6}(μ3-OH)_{2}]·CH_{3}CN crystals. It can be used in the preparation of some optical materials.
