= Ruthenium(III) acetylacetonate =

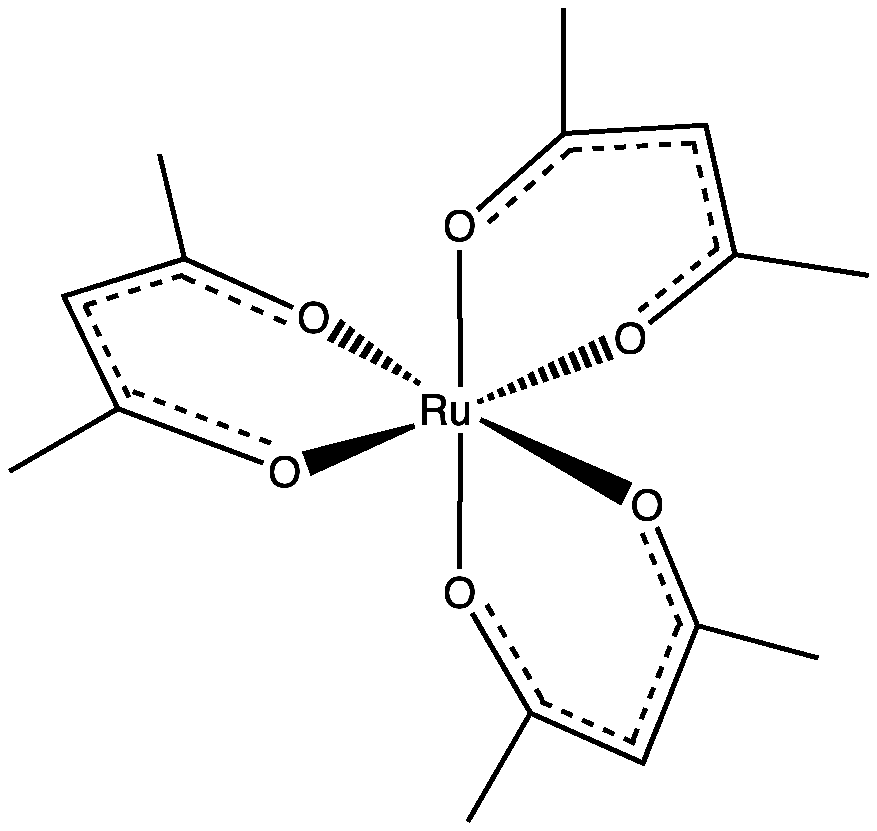

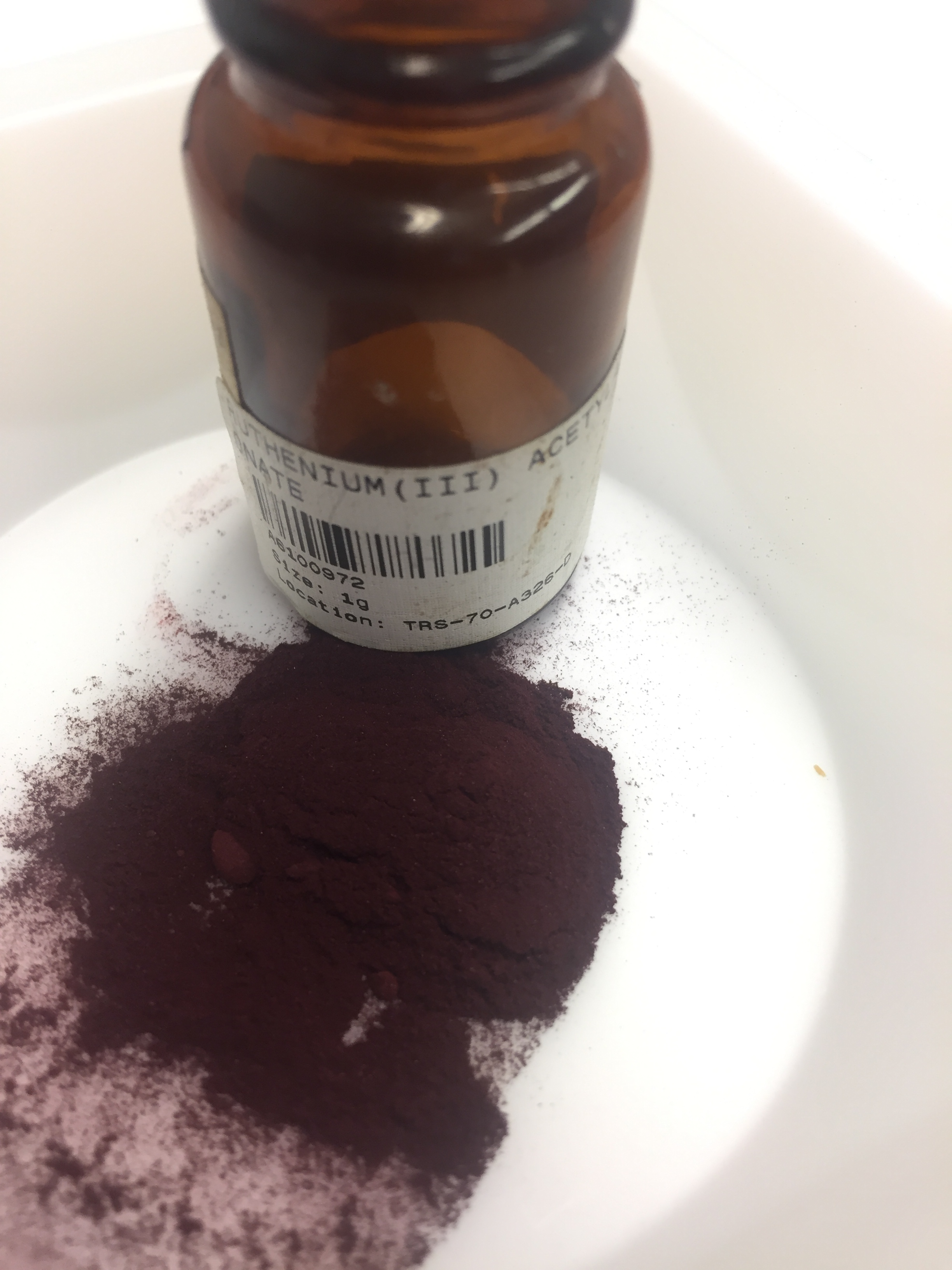

Names
- IUPAC name Tris(acetylacetonato)ruthenium(III)
- Systematic IUPAC name Tris[(Z)-4-oxopent-2-en-2-olato-κ^{2}O,O′]ruthenium(III)
- Other names Ru(acac)_{3}; Ruthenium(III) 2,4-Pentanedionate; Ruthenium(III) acetylacetonato, 2,4-pentanedione ruthenium(III)

Identifiers
CAS Number	14284-93-6
3D model (JSmol)	Interactive image
ChemSpider	4590002
ECHA InfoCard	100.034.705
EC Number	238-193-0
PubChem CID	5488829
CompTox Dashboard (EPA)	DTXSID10904287
- InChI: InChI=1S/3C5H8O2.Ru/c3*1-4(6)3-5(2)7;/h3*3,6H,1-2H3;/q;;;+3/p-3/b3*4-3-; Key: RTZYCRSRNSTRGC-LNTINUHCSA-K
- SMILES: [O+]1=C(C)C=C(C)[O+]=[Ru-3]123(=[O+]C(C)=CC(C)=[O+]2)[O+]=C(C)C=C(C)[O+]=3

Properties
Chemical formula	(C_{5}H_{7}O_{2})_{3}Ru
Molar mass	398.39 g/mol
Appearance	Dark red solid
Density	1.54 g/cm^{3}
Melting point	260 °C (500 °F; 533 K)
Solubility in water	insoluble in water
Solubility	soluble in most organic solvents

Hazards
- GHS labelling
Pictograms	(GHS07: Exclamation mark)
Signal word	Warning
Hazard statements	H302, H315, H319, H335, H413
- Except where otherwise noted, data are given for materials in their standard state (at 25 °C [77 °F], 100 kPa). verify (what is ?) Infobox references

Ruthenium(III) acetylacetonate is a coordination complex with the formula Ru(O_{2}C_{5}H_{7})_{3}. O_{2}C_{5}H_{7}^{−} is the ligand called acetylacetonate. This compound exists as a dark red solid that is soluble in most organic solvents. It is used as a precursor to other compounds of ruthenium.

== Structure and properties ==
This compound has idealized D_{3} symmetry. Six oxygen atoms surround the central ruthenium atom in an octahedral arrangement. The average Ru-O bond length in Ru(acac)_{3} is 2.00 Å. Because Ru(acac)_{3} is low spin, there is one unpaired d electron, causing this compound to be paramagnetic. Ru(acac)_{3} has a magnetic susceptibility, χ_{M}, of 3.032×10^{−6} cm^{3}/mol with an effective magnetic moment, μ_{eff}, of 1.66 μ_{B}. As a solution in dimethylformamide, the compound oxidizes at 0.593 and reduces at -1.223 V vs the ferrocene/ferrocenium couple.

Reduction of Ru(acac)_{3} in the presence of alkenes affords the related diolefin complexes. Typically, such reactions are conducted with zinc amalgam in moist tetrahydrofuran:

2 Ru(acac)_{3} + 4 alkene + Zn → 2 Ru(acac)_{2}(alkene)_{2} + Zn(acac)_{2}

The resulting compounds are rare examples of metal-alkene complexes that reversibly sustain oxidation:

Ru(acac)_{2}(alkene)_{2} ⇌ [Ru(acac)_{2}(alkene)_{2}]^{+} + e^{−}

The complex has been resolved into individual enantiomers by separation of its adduct with dibenzoyltartaric acid.

== Preparation ==
In 1914 tris(acetylacetonato)ruthenium(III) was first prepared by the reaction of ruthenium(III) chloride and acetylacetone in the presence of potassium bicarbonate. Since then, alternative synthetic routes have been examined, but the original procedure remains useful with minor variations:

RuCl_{3}•3H_{2}O + MeCOCH_{2}COMe → Ru(acac)_{3} + 3 HCl + 3 H_{2}O
