= Isopropenyl acetate =

Names
- Preferred IUPAC name Prop-1-en-2-yl acetate
- Other names 1-Methylvinyl acetate

Identifiers
CAS Number	108-22-5
3D model (JSmol)	Interactive image
ChemSpider	7628
ECHA InfoCard	100.003.239
EC Number	203-562-7
PubChem CID	7916
UNII	4AR9LAS337
CompTox Dashboard (EPA)	DTXSID3031492
- InChI: InChI=1S/C5H8O2/c1-4(2)7-5(3)6/h1H2,2-3H3 Key: HETCEOQFVDFGSY-UHFFFAOYSA-N
- SMILES: CC(=C)OC(=O)C

Properties
Chemical formula	C_{5}H_{8}O_{2}
Molar mass	100.117 g·mol^{−1}
Appearance	Colorless liquid
Density	0.9090 g/cm^{3} (20 °C)
Melting point	−92.9 °C (−135.2 °F; 180.2 K)
Boiling point	97 °C (207 °F; 370 K)
- Except where otherwise noted, data are given for materials in their standard state (at 25 °C [77 °F], 100 kPa). Infobox references

Isopropenyl acetate is an organic compound, which is the acetate ester of the enol tautomer of acetone. This colorless liquid is significant commercially as the principal precursor to acetylacetone. In organic synthesis, it is used to prepare enol acetates of ketones and acetonides from diols.

== Preparation ==
Isopropenyl acetate is prepared by treating acetone with ketene. Upon heating over a metal surface, isopropenyl acetate rearranges to acetylacetone.

== Reactions ==
Isopropenyl acetate is used to prepare other isopropenyl ethers.

Isopropenyl acetate reacts with ketones to give new enol acetates:

CH_{2}=CH(OAc)CH_{3} + RC(O)CH_{3} → CH_{2}=CH(OAc)R + (CH_{3})_{2}C=O
