= 1,1,1-Trifluoroacetylacetone =

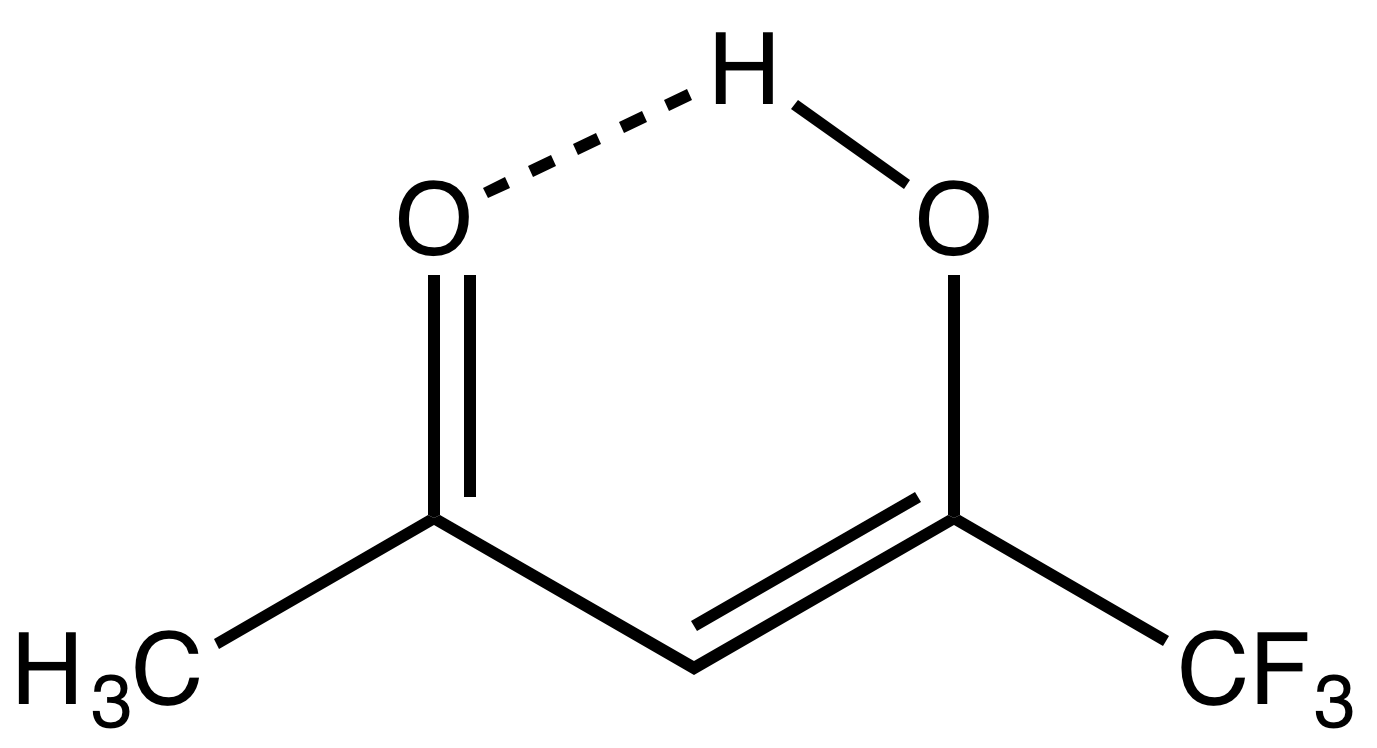

Names
- Preferred IUPAC name 1,1,1-Trifluoropentane-2,4-dione
- Other names 1,1,1-Trifluoro-2,4-pentanedione, (trifluoroacetyl)acetone, 1,1,1-(trifluoroacetyl)acetone, 1,1,1-TFAA

Identifiers
CAS Number	367-57-7
3D model (JSmol)	Interactive image
ChemSpider	66573
ECHA InfoCard	100.006.090
EC Number	206-698-5
PubChem CID	73943
UNII	9N20A8G8SW
CompTox Dashboard (EPA)	DTXSID3059896
- InChI: InChI=1S/C5H5F3O2/c1-3(9)2-4(10)5(6,7)8/h2H2,1H3 Key: SHXHPUAKLCCLDV-UHFFFAOYSA-N
- SMILES: CC(=O)CC(=O)C(F)(F)F

Properties
Chemical formula	C_{5}H_{4}F_{3}O_{2}
Molar mass	153.080 g·mol^{−1}
Appearance	colorless liquid
Density	1.27 g/cm^{3}

Hazards
- GHS labelling
Pictograms	(GHS02: Flammable) (GHS07: Exclamation mark)
Signal word	Warning
Hazard statements	H226, H302, H312, H315, H319, H332
Precautionary statements	P210, P233, P240, P241, P242, P243, P261, P264, P270, P271, P280, P301+P312, P302+P352, P303+P361+P353, P304+P312, P304+P340, P305+P351+P338, P312, P321, P322, P330, P332+P313, P337+P313, P362, P363, P370+P378, P403+P235, P501
- Except where otherwise noted, data are given for materials in their standard state (at 25 °C [77 °F], 100 kPa). Infobox references

1,1,1-Trifluoroacetylacetone is the organofluorine compound with the formula CF_{3}C(O)CH_{2}C(O)CH_{3}. It is a colorless liquid. Like other 1,3-diketones, it is used as a precursor to heterocycles, e.g. pyrazoles, and metal chelates. It is prepared by condensation of esters of trifluoroacetic acid with acetone.

According to an analysis by proton NMR spectroscopy, the compound exists predominantly (97% at 33 °C, neat) as the enol. For comparison under the same conditions, the percent enol for acetylacetone and hexafluoroacetylacetone are 85 and 100%, respectively.
