= Acetylacetone-cleaving enzyme =

Class of enzymes

Identifiers
- EC no.: 1.13.11.50
- CAS no.: 524047-53-8

Databases
- IntEnz: IntEnz view
- BRENDA: BRENDA entry
- ExPASy: NiceZyme view
- KEGG: KEGG entry
- MetaCyc: metabolic pathway
- PRIAM: profile
- PDB structures: RCSB PDB PDBe PDBsum
Search
- PMC: articles
- PubMed: articles
- NCBI: proteins

Acetylacetone-cleaving enzyme (EC 1.13.11.50) is an enzyme that catalyzes the chemical reaction

acetylacetone
O_{2}
acetic acid
+
methylglyoxal

The two substrates of this enzyme are acetylacetone and oxygen. Its products are acetic acid and methylglyoxal.

This enzyme belongs to the family of oxidoreductases, specifically those acting on single donors with O_{2} as oxidant and incorporation of two atoms of oxygen into the substrate (oxygenases). The oxygen incorporated need not be derived from O_{2}. The systematic name of this enzyme class is acetylacetone:oxygen oxidoreductase. Other names in common use include Dke1, acetylacetone dioxygenase, diketone cleaving dioxygenase, and diketone cleaving enzyme.
