= Iridium acetylacetonate =

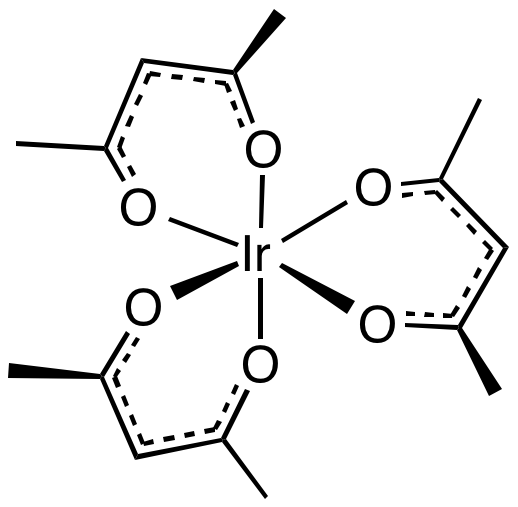

Names
- IUPAC name Tris(acetylacetonato)iridium(III)
- Systematic IUPAC name Tris[(Z)-4-oxopent-2-en-2-olato-κ^{2}O,O′]iridium(III)

Identifiers
CAS Number	15635-87-7
3D model (JSmol)	Interactive image
ChemSpider	10745901
ECHA InfoCard	100.036.086
EC Number	239-711-8
PubChem CID	16212107
CompTox Dashboard (EPA)	DTXSID40935428
- InChI: InChI=1S/3C5H8O2.Ir/c3*1-4(6)3-5(2)7;/h3*3H2,1-2H3; Key: ORBAMVQDIYATLY-UHFFFAOYSA-N
- SMILES: CC(=O)C=C(C)[O-].CC(=O)C=C(C)[O-].CC(=O)C=C(C)[O-].[Ir+3]

Properties
Chemical formula	C_{15}H_{21}IrO_{6}
Molar mass	489.544 g·mol^{−1}
Appearance	orange solid
Melting point	269 to 271 °C (516 to 520 °F; 542 to 544 K) (decomposes)
- Except where otherwise noted, data are given for materials in their standard state (at 25 °C [77 °F], 100 kPa). Infobox references

Iridium acetylacetonate is the iridium coordination complex with the formula Ir(O_{2}C_{5}H_{7})_{3}, which is sometimes known as Ir(acac)_{3}. The molecule has D_{3}-symmetry. It is a yellow-orange solid that is soluble in organic solvents.

== Preparation and isomerism ==
It is prepared from IrCl_{3}(H_{2}O)_{3} and acetylacetone. The complex has been resolved into individual enantiomers by separation of its adduct with dibenzoyltartaric acid.

A second linkage isomers is also known. In the second isomer one of the acetylacetonate ligands is bonded to Ir through carbon.

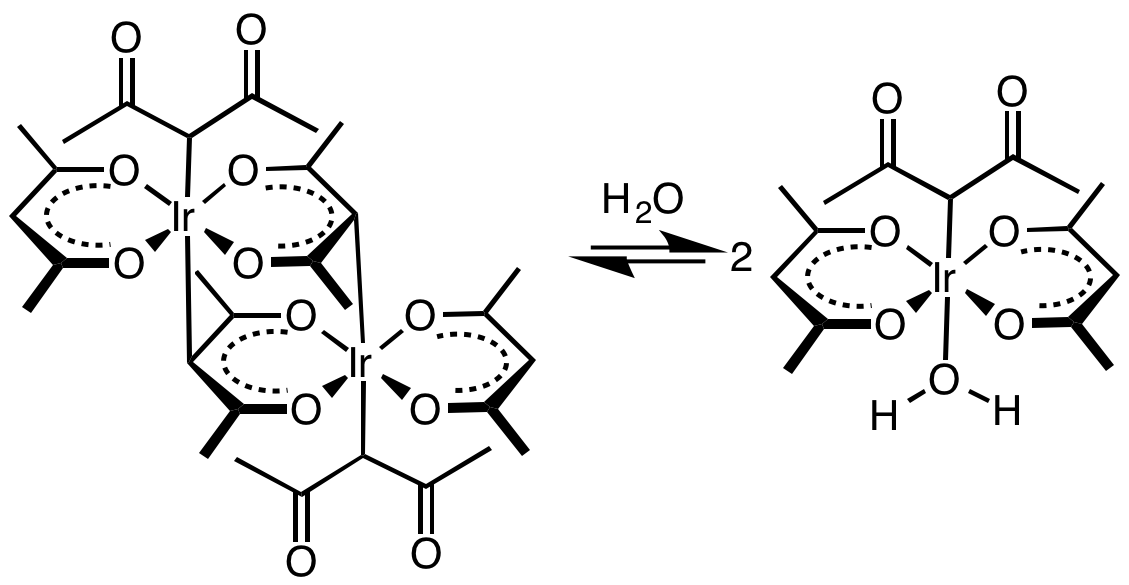
Structures of C-bonded "Ir(acac)_{3}"

== Uses ==
The O_{6}-bonded isomer has been investigated for use chemical vapor deposition (CVD). One example is the deposition of red phosphorescent emitter compounds used in OLEDs.

The C-bonded isomer has been investigated as a catalyst for C-H activation reactions.
