= Enol =

Organic compound with a C=C–OH group

Keto-enol tautomerism examples

3-Pentanone, a less stabilized enol (ketone left, enol right)

2-Butanone resonance forms (carbanion left, enoxide right)

2,4-pentanedione, a hydrogen bond (---) stabilized enol (mono-enol left, diketone right)

Tartronaldehyde, a reductone enediol (enol left, aldehyde right)

In organic chemistry, enols are a type of functional group or intermediate in organic chemistry. Formally, enols are derivatives of vinyl alcohol, with a C=C−OH connectivity. The term enol is an abbreviation of alkenol, a portmanteau deriving from "-ene"/"alkene" and "-ol"/"alcohol".

Keto–enol tautomerism refers to a chemical equilibrium between a "keto" form (a carbonyl, named for the common ketone case) and an enol. The tautomeric interconversion involves hydrogen atom movement and the reorganisation of bonding electrons.

Many kinds of enols are known, but very few are stable compounds. However, deprotonation of organic carbonyls gives enolate anions, which are important in organic reaction strategies as a strong nucleophile.

== Enolization ==
Organic esters, ketones, and aldehydes with an α-hydrogen (C−H bond adjacent to the carbonyl group) often form enols. The reaction involves migration of a proton (H) from carbon to oxygen:

RC(=O)CHR′R′′ ⇌ RC(OH)=CR′R′′

The process does not occur intramolecularly, but requires participation of solvent or other mediators.

Strictly speaking, the conversion is a keto-enol tautomerism only in the case of ketones (neither R nor R′ hydrogen). But this name is often more generally applied to all such tautomerizations.

The keto-enol equilibrium involves movement of a double bond. If the α position of an enol is substituted (i.e., not a methyl ketone), then it is prochiral, forming a new stereocenter when in keto form. Conversely, enolization racemizes that stereocenter.

== Occurrence and reactivity ==
Usually the tautomerization equilibrium constant is so small that the enol is undetectable spectroscopically. In the equilibrium between vinyl alcohol and acetaldehyde, K = [enol]/[keto] ≈ 5.8×10^{−7}.

The terminus of the double bond in enols is nucleophilic, a property enhanced in the case of enolate anions. However, enolates protonate reversibly at the oxygen much faster than equilibrate to the ketone/aldehyde/etc. As many organic syntheses involve the controlled formation and reaction of enolates, enols appear transiently in great quantities during quenching.

=== Stable enols ===
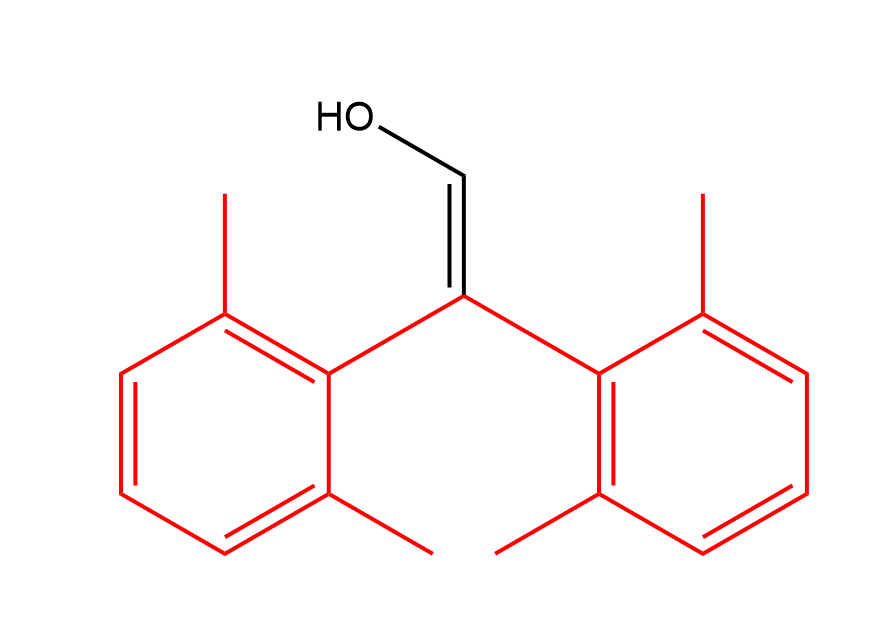
Diaryl-substitution stabilizes some enols.

Enols can be stabilized through vinylogy. Thus, very stable enols are phenols.

In compounds with two (or more) carbonyls, the enol form is also stabilized through intramolecular hydrogen bonding and becomes dominant. The behavior of 2,4-pentanedione illustrates this effect:

Selected enolization constants
carbonyl	enol	K_{enolization}
Acetaldehyde; CH_{3}CHO	CH_{2}=CHOH	5.8×10^{−7}
Acetone; CH_{3}C(O)CH_{3}	CH_{3}C(OH)=CH_{2}	5.12×10^{−7}
Methyl acetate CH_{3}CO_{2}CH_{3}	CH_{2}=CH(OH)OCH_{3}	4×10^{−20}
Acetophenone; C_{6}H_{5}C(O)CH_{3}	C_{6}H_{5}C(OH)=CH_{2}	1×10^{−8}
Acetylacetone; CH_{3}C(O)CH_{2}C(O)CH_{3}	CH_{3}C(O)CH=C(OH)CH_{3}	0.27
Trifluoroacetylacetone; CH_{3}C(O)CH_{2}C(O)CF_{3}	CH_{3}C(O)CH=C(OH)CF_{3}	32
Hexafluoroacetylacetone; CF_{3}C(O)CH_{2}C(O)CF_{3}	CF_{3}C(O)CH=C(OH)CF_{3}	~10^{4}
Cyclohexa-2,4-dienone	Phenol; C_{6}H_{5}OH	>10^{12}

==== Phenols ====
Phenols represent a kind of enol. For some phenols and related compounds, the keto tautomer plays an important role. Many of the reactions of resorcinol and phloroglucinol involve the keto tautomers, for example. Naphthalene-1,4-diol exists in observable equilibrium with the diketone tetrahydronaphthalene-1,4-dione.

== Biochemistry ==
Keto–enol tautomerism is important in several areas of biochemistry.

The high phosphate-transfer potential of phosphoenolpyruvate results from the fact that the phosphorylated compound is "trapped" in the less thermodynamically favorable enol form, whereas after dephosphorylation it can assume the keto form.

The enzyme enolase catalyzes the dehydration of 2-phosphoglyceric acid to the enol phosphate ester. Metabolism of PEP to pyruvic acid by pyruvate kinase (PK) generates adenosine triphosphate (ATP) via substrate-level phosphorylation.

H_{2}O	ADP	ATP
H_{2}O

=== Enediols ===
Enediols are alkenes with a hydroxyl group on each carbon of the C=C double bond. Normally such compounds are disfavored components in equilibria with acyloins. One special case is catechol, where the C=C subunit is part of an aromatic ring. In some other cases however, enediols are stabilized by flanking carbonyl groups. These stabilized enediols are called reductones. Such species are important in glycochemistry, e.g., the Lobry de Bruyn–Van Ekenstein transformation.

Hydroxyacetone tautomers (enediol center; acyloins left and right)

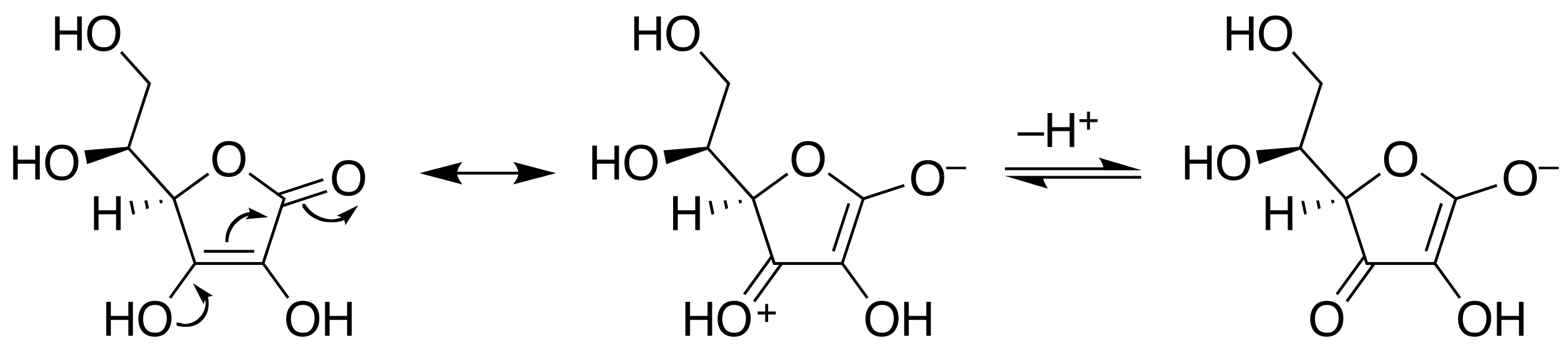
Conversion of ascorbic acid (vitamin C) to an enolate. Enediol at left, enolate at right, showing movement of electron pairs resulting in deprotonation of the stable parent enediol. A distinct, more complex chemical system, exhibiting the characteristic of vinylogy.

Ribulose-1,5-bisphosphate is a key substrate in the Calvin cycle of photosynthesis. In the Calvin cycle, the ribulose equilibrates with the enediol, which then binds carbon dioxide. The same enediol is also susceptible to attack by oxygen (O_{2}) in the (undesirable) process called photorespiration.

Keto-enediol equilibrium for ribulose-1,5-bisphosphate.

== See also ==
- Alkenal
- Enolase
- Geminal diol, another form of ketones and aldehydes in water solutions
- Ketone
- Regioselectivity
- Ynol
