= Hexafluoroacetylacetone =

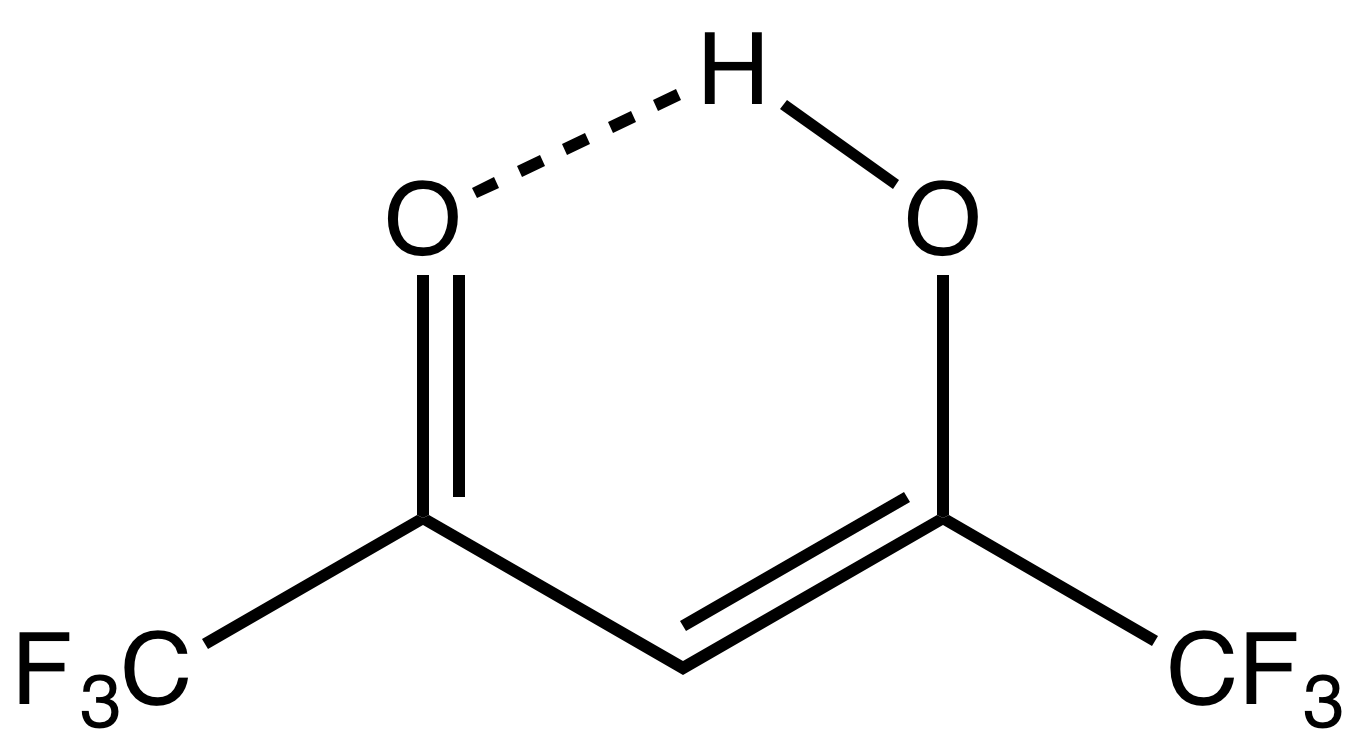

Names
- IUPAC name 1,1,1,5,5,5-hexafluoro-pentane-2,4-dione
- Other names Hexafluoroacetylacetone, HfacH

Identifiers
CAS Number	1522-22-1
3D model (JSmol)	Interactive image
ChemSpider	21106446
ECHA InfoCard	100.014.719
PubChem CID	73706
UNII	MG8477QRV4
CompTox Dashboard (EPA)	DTXSID701336251 DTXSID4061753, DTXSID701336251
- InChI: InChI=1S/C5H2F6O2/c6-4(7,8)2(12)1-3(13)5(9,10)11/h1H2 Key: QAMFBRUWYYMMGJ-UHFFFAOYSA-N; InChI=1/C5H2F6O2/c6-4(7,8)2(12)1-3(13)5(9,10)11/h1H2 Key: QAMFBRUWYYMMGJ-UHFFFAOYAR
- SMILES: FC(F)(F)C(=O)CC(=O)C(F)(F)F

Properties
Chemical formula	C_{5}H_{2}F_{6}O_{2}
Molar mass	208.06 g/mol
Appearance	colourless liquid
Density	1.47 g/mL
Boiling point	70 to 71 °C (158 to 160 °F; 343 to 344 K)
Solubility in water	organic solvents
- Except where otherwise noted, data are given for materials in their standard state (at 25 °C [77 °F], 100 kPa). verify (what is ?) Infobox references

Hexafluoroacetylacetone is the chemical compound with the nominal formula CF_{3}C(O)CH_{2}C(O)CF_{3} (often abbreviated as hfacH). This colourless liquid is a ligand precursor and a reagent used in MOCVD. The compound exists exclusively as the enol CF_{3}C(OH)=CHC(O)CF_{3}. For comparison under the same conditions, acetylacetone is 85% enol.

Metal complexes of the conjugate base exhibit enhanced volatility and Lewis acidity relative to analogous complexes derived from acetylacetone. The visible spectra of bis(hexafluoroacetylacetonato)copper(II) and its dehydrate have been reported in carbon tetrachloride. Compounds of the type bis(hexafluoroacetylacetonato)copper(II):B_{n}, where :B are Lewis bases such as N,N-dimethylacetamide, dimethyl sulfoxide, or pyridine and n = 1 or 2, have been prepared. Since bis(hexafluoroacetylacetonato)copper(II) is soluble in carbon tetrachloride, its Lewis acid properties have been studied for 1:1 adducts using a variety of Lewis bases.

This organofluorine compound was first prepared by the condensation of ethyl ester of trifluoroacetic acid and 1,1,1-trifluoroacetone. It has been investigated as an etchant for copper and its complexes, such as Cu(Hfac)(trimethylvinylsilane) have been employed as precursors in microelectronics.

Being highly electrophilic, hexafluoroacetylacetone is hydrated in water to give the tetraol.
