= Acetylacetone =

Organic chemical compound CH3–C(=O)–CH2–C(=O)–CH3

- Skeletal structures of both tautomers

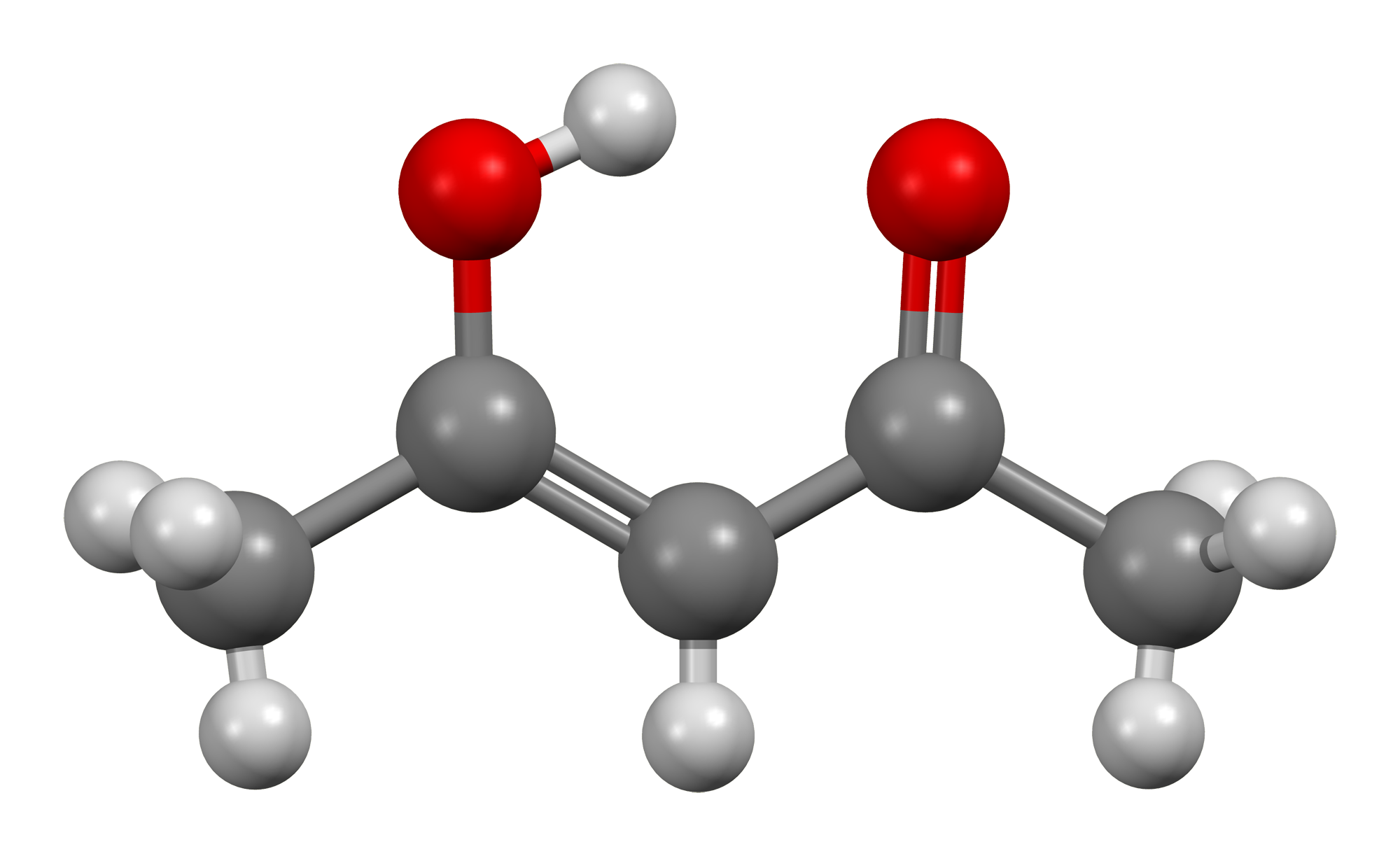
Ball-and-stick model of the enol tautomer
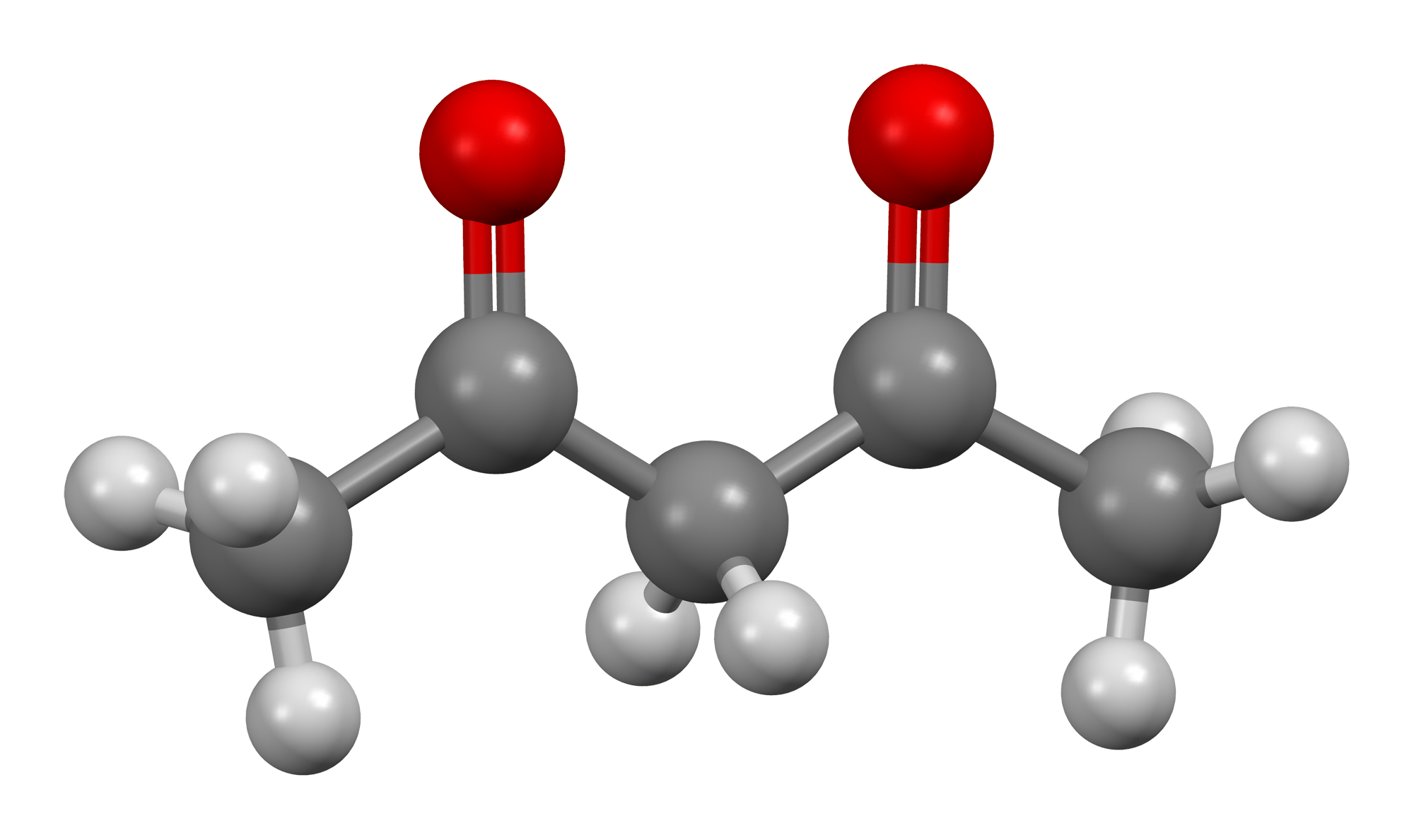
Ball-and-stick model of the keto tautomer
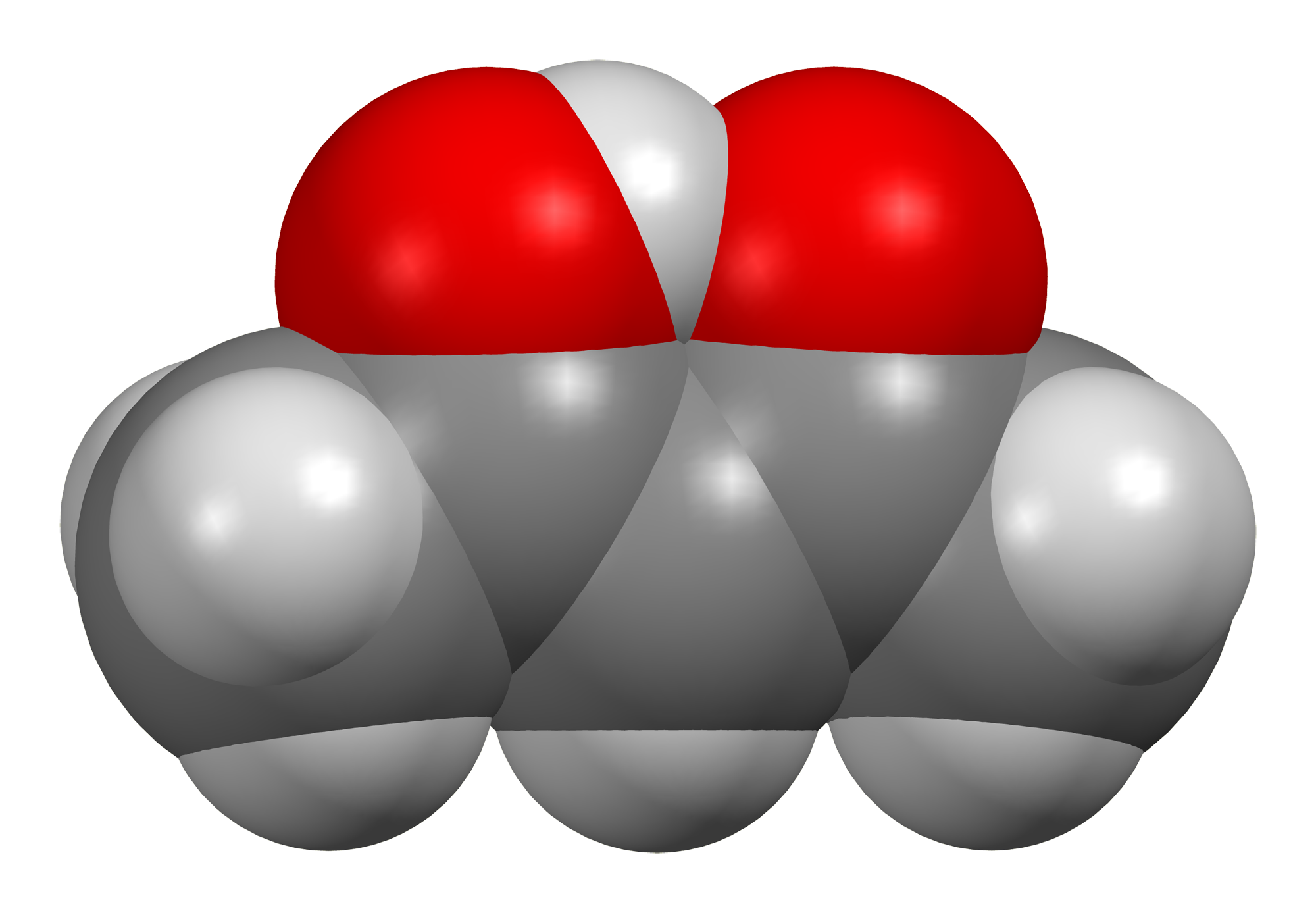
Space-filling model of the enol tautomer
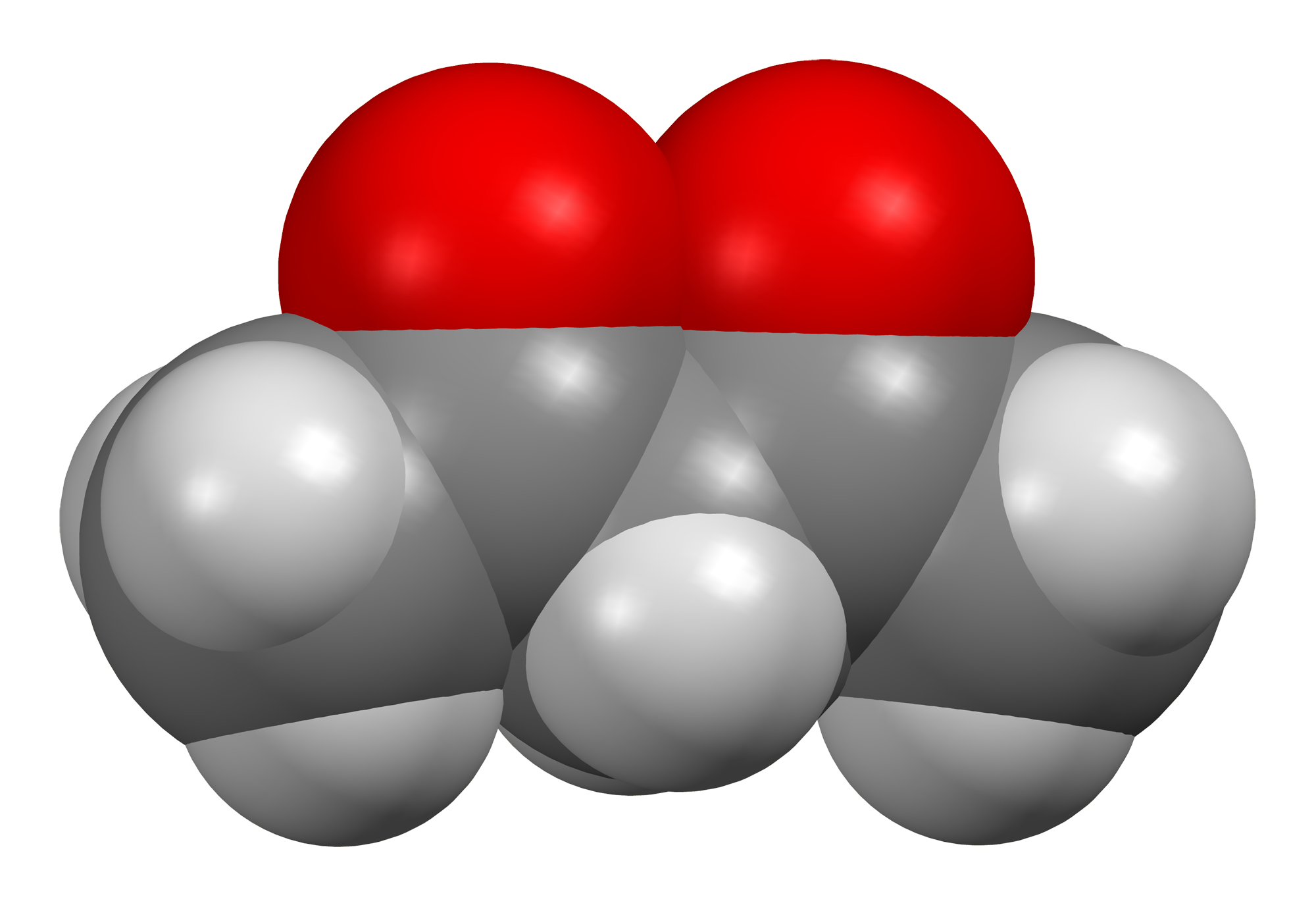
Space-filling model of the keto tautomer

Names
- IUPAC names (3Z)-4-Hydroxy-3-penten-2-one (enol form); Pentane-2,4-dione (keto form)
- Other names: Hacac; 2,4-Pentanedione; Acetylacetonic acid

Identifiers
CAS Number	123-54-6
3D model (JSmol)	Interactive image; Interactive image; Enol form: Interactive image
Beilstein Reference	741937
ChEBI	CHEBI:14750
ChEMBL	ChEMBL191625
ChemSpider	29001
ECHA InfoCard	100.004.214
EC Number	204-634-0
Gmelin Reference	2537
KEGG	C15499
PubChem CID	31261
RTECS number	SA1925000
UNII	46R950BP4J
UN number	2310
CompTox Dashboard (EPA)	DTXSID4021979
- InChI: InChI=1S/C5H8O2/c1-4(6)3-5(2)7/h3H2,1-2H3 Key: YRKCREAYFQTBPV-UHFFFAOYSA-N; InChI=1/C5H8O2/c1-4(6)3-5(2)7/h3H2,1-2H3 Key: YRKCREAYFQTBPV-UHFFFAOYAO
- SMILES: O=C(C)CC(=O)C; CC(=O)CC(=O)C; Enol form: CC(O)=CC(=O)C

Properties
Chemical formula	C_{5}H_{8}O_{2}
Molar mass	100.117 g·mol^{−1}
Appearance	Colorless liquid
Density	0.975 g/mL
Melting point	−23 °C (−9 °F; 250 K)
Boiling point	140 °C (284 °F; 413 K)
Solubility in water	16 g/100 mL
Magnetic susceptibility (χ)	−54.88×10^{−6} cm^{3}/mol

Hazards
- GHS labelling
Pictograms	(GHS02: Flammable) (GHS06: Toxic) (GHS07: Exclamation mark) (GHS08: Health hazard)
Signal word	Danger
Hazard statements	H226, H302, H311, H320, H331, H335, H341, H370, H412
Precautionary statements	P201, P202, P210, P233, P240, P241, P242, P243, P260, P264, P270, P271, P273, P280, P281, P301+P312, P302+P352, P303+P361+P353, P304+P340, P305+P351+P338, P307+P311, P308+P313, P311, P312, P321, P322, P330, P337+P313, P361, P363, P370+P378, P403+P233, P403+P235, P405, P501
NFPA 704 (fire diamond)	2 2 0
Flash point	34 °C (93 °F; 307 K)
Autoignition temperature	340 °C (644 °F; 613 K)
Explosive limits	2.4–11.6%
- Except where otherwise noted, data are given for materials in their standard state (at 25 °C [77 °F], 100 kPa). verify (what is ?) Infobox references

Acetylacetone is an organic compound with the chemical formula CH_{3}−C(=O)−CH_{2}−C(=O)−CH_{3}. It is classified as a 1,3-diketone. It exists in equilibrium with a tautomer CH_{3}−C(=O)−CH=C(−OH)−CH_{3}. The mixture is a colorless liquid. These tautomers interconvert so rapidly under most conditions that they are treated as a single compound in most applications. Acetylacetone is a building block for the synthesis of many coordination complexes as well as heterocyclic compounds.

== Properties ==
=== Tautomerism ===
Solvent	K_{keto→enol}	pK_{keto→enol}
Gas phase	11.7	−1.068
Cyclohexane	42	−1.62
Toluene	10	−1.0
THF	7.2	−0.86
CDCl_{3}	5.7	−0.76
DMSO	2	−0.3
Water	0.23	0.64

The keto and enol tautomers of acetylacetone coexist in solution. The enol form has C_{2v} symmetry, meaning the hydrogen atom is shared equally between the two oxygen atoms. In the gas phase, the equilibrium constant, K_{keto→enol}, is 11.7, favoring the enol form because of the hydrogen bonding between the hydroxy and the oxy group. The two tautomeric forms can be distinguished by NMR spectroscopy, IR spectroscopy and other methods.

The equilibrium constant tends to be high in nonpolar solvents; when K_{keto→enol} is equal or greater than 1, the enol form is favoured. The keto form becomes more favourable in polar, hydrogen-bonding solvents, such as water. The enol form is a vinylogous analogue of a carboxylic acid.

=== Acid–base properties ===
Solvent	T/°C	pK_{a}
40% ethanol/water	30	9.8
70% dioxane/water	28	12.5
80% DMSO/water	25	10.16
DMSO	25	13.41

Acetylacetone is a weak acid. It forms the acetylacetonate anion C_{5}H_{7}O^{−}_{2} (commonly abbreviated acac^{−}):

C_{5}H_{8}O_{2} ⇌ C_{5}H_{7}O^{−}_{2} + H^{+}

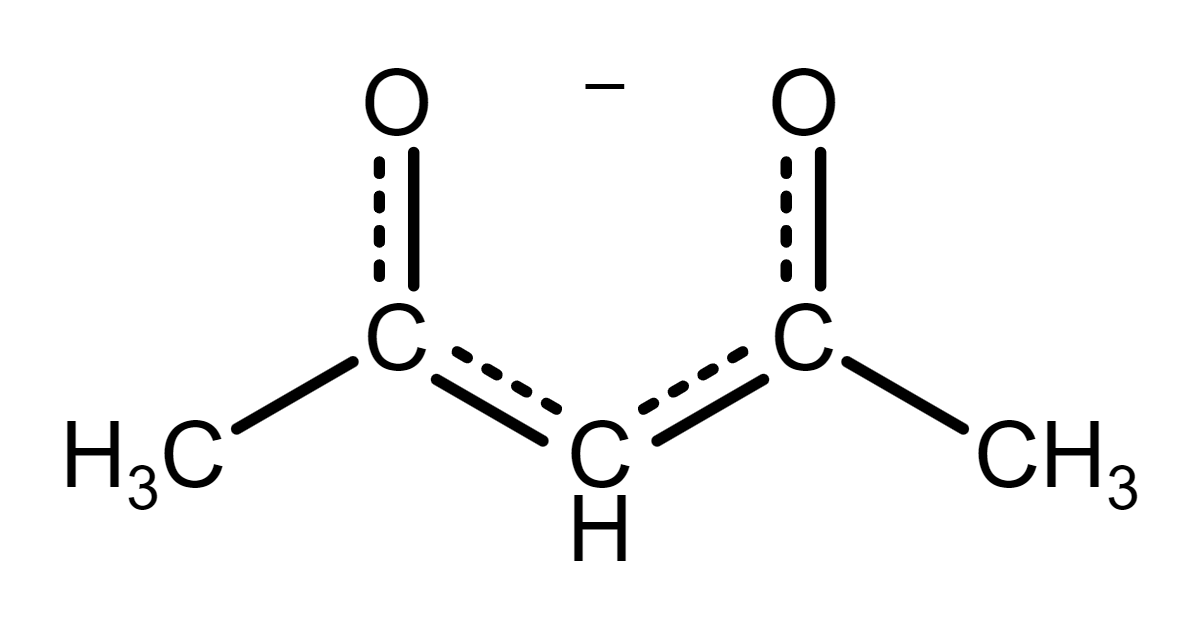
The structure of the acetylacetonate anion (acac^{−})

In the acetylacetonate anion, both C−O bonds are equivalent. Both C−C central bonds are equivalent as well, with one hydrogen atom bonded to the central carbon atom (the atom numbered C3 according to the IUPAC nomenclature of organic chemistry). These equivalencies are because there is a resonance between the four bonds in the O−C2−C3−C4−O linkage in the acetylacetonate anion. Each of the four bonds in the linkage has a bond order of about 1.5, and the two oxygen atoms equally share the negative charge. The acetylacetonate anion is a bidentate ligand.

IUPAC recommended pK_{a} values for this equilibrium in aqueous solution at 25 °C are 8.99 ± 0.04 (I = 0), 8.83 ± 0.02 (I = 0.1 M NaClO_{4}) and 9.00 ± 0.03 (I = 1.0 M NaClO_{4}; I = Ionic strength). Values for mixed solvents are available. Very strong bases, such as organolithium compounds, will deprotonate acetylacetone twice. The resulting dilithium species can then be alkylated at the carbon atom at the position 1.

== Preparation ==
Acetylacetone is prepared industrially by the thermal rearrangement of isopropenyl acetate.

CH3C(O)OC(CH2)CH3 becomes CH3C(O)CH2C(O)CH3

Laboratory routes to acetylacetone also begin with acetone. Acetone and acetic anhydride ((CH_{3}C(O))_{2}O) upon the addition of boron trifluoride (BF_{3}) catalyst:

(CH_{3}C(O))_{2}O + CH_{3}C(O)CH_{3} → CH_{3}C(O)CH_{2}C(O)CH_{3}

A second synthesis involves the base-catalyzed condensation (such as by sodium ethoxide CH_{3}CH_{2}O^{−}Na^{+}) of acetone and ethyl acetate, followed by acidification of the sodium acetylacetonate (such as by hydrogen chloride HCl):

CH_{3}CH_{2}O^{−}Na^{+} + CH_{3}C(O)OCH_{2}CH_{3} + CH_{3}C(O)CH_{3} → Na^{+}[CH_{3}C(O)CHC(O^{−})CH_{3}] + 2 CH_{3}CH_{2}OH
Na^{+}[CH_{3}C(O)CHC(O^{−})CH_{3}] + HCl → CH_{3}C(O)CH_{2}C(O)CH_{3} + NaCl

Because of the ease of these syntheses, many analogues of acetylacetonates are known. Some examples are benzoylacetone, dibenzoylmethane and tert-butyl analogue 2,2,6,6-tetramethyl-3,5-heptanedione. Trifluoroacetylacetone and hexafluoroacetylacetonate are also used to generate volatile metal complexes.

== Reactions ==
=== Condensations ===
Acetylacetone is a versatile bifunctional precursor to heterocycles because both keto groups may undergo condensation. For example, condensation with hydrazine produces pyrazoles while condensation with urea provides pyrimidines. Condensation with two aryl- or alkylamines gives NacNacs, wherein the oxygen atoms in acetylacetone are replaced by NR (R = aryl, alkyl).

=== Coordination chemistry ===
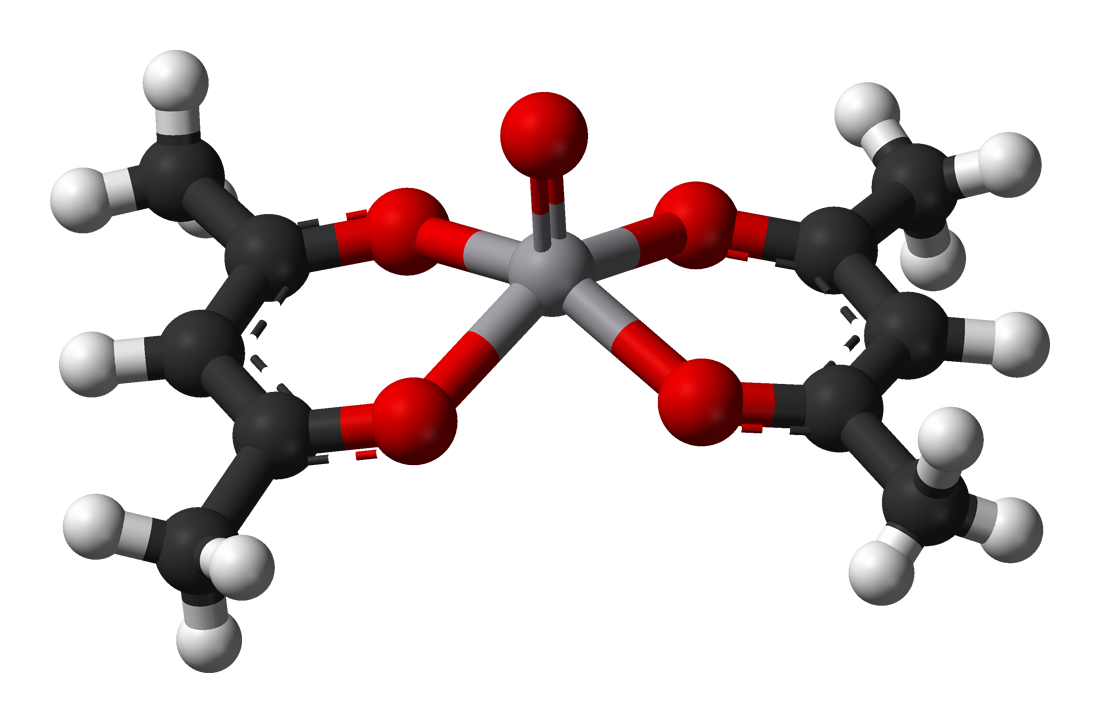
A ball-and-stick model of VO(acac)_{2}

Sodium acetylacetonate, Na(acac), is the precursor to many acetylacetonate complexes. A general method of synthesis is to treat a metal salt with acetylacetone in the presence of a base:

MB_{z} + z Hacac ⇌ M(acac)_{z} + z BH

Both oxygen atoms bind to the metal to form a six-membered chelate ring. In some cases the chelate effect is so strong that no added base is needed to form the complex.

== Biodegradation ==
The enzyme acetylacetone dioxygenase cleaves a central carbon-carbon bond of acetylacetone, producing acetate and 2-oxopropanal. The enzyme is iron(II)-dependent, but it has been proven to bind to zinc as well. Acetylacetone degradation has been characterized in the bacterium Acinetobacter johnsonii.

CH_{3}C(O)CH_{2}C(O)CH_{3} + O_{2} → CH_{3}COOH + CH_{3}C(O)CHO
