= Harpagoside =

Names
- IUPAC name (1S,4aS,5R,7S,7aS)-1-(β-D-Glucopyranosyloxy)-4a,5-dihydroxy-7-methyl-1,4a,5,6,7,7a-hexahydrocyclopenta[c]pyran-7-yl (2E)-3-phenylprop-2-enoate
- Systematic IUPAC name (1S,4aS,5R,7S,7aS)-4a,5-Dihydroxy-7-methyl-1-{[(2S,3R,4S,5S,6R)-3,4,5-trihydroxy-6-(hydroxymethyl)oxan-2-yl]oxy}-1,4a,5,6,7,7a-hexahydrocyclopenta[c]pyran-7-yl (2E)-3-phenylprop-2-enoate

Identifiers
| CAS Number | 19210-12-9 |
| 3D model (JSmol) | Interactive image |
| ChemSpider | 4444874 |
| ECHA InfoCard | 100.038.967 |
| PubChem CID | 5281542 |
| UNII | 8KGS1DC5ZU |
- InChI: InChI=1S/C24H30O11/c1-23(35-16(27)8-7-13-5-3-2-4-6-13)11-15(26)24(31)9-10-32-22(20(23)24)34-21-19(30)18(29)17(28)14(12-25)33-21/h2-10,14-15,17-22,25-26,28-31H,11-12H2,1H3/b8-7+/t14-,15-,17-,18+,19-,20-,21+,22+,23+,24-/m1/s1 Key: KVRQGMOSZKPBNS-FMHLWDFHSA-N
- SMILES: C[C@@]1(C[C@H]([C@]2([C@@H]1[C@@H](OC=C2)O[C@H]3[C@@H]([C@H]([C@@H]([C@H](O3)CO)O)O)O)O)O)OC(=O)/C=C/c4ccccc4

Properties
| Chemical formula | C_{24}H_{30}O_{11} |
| Molar mass | 494.493 g·mol^{−1} |
- Except where otherwise noted, data are given for materials in their standard state (at 25 °C [77 °F], 100 kPa). Infobox references

Harpagoside is a natural product found in the plant Harpagophytum procumbens, also known as devil's claw. It is the active chemical constituent responsible for the medicinal properties of the plant, which have been used for centuries by the Khoisan people of southern Africa to treat diverse health disorders, including fever, diabetes, hypertension, and various blood related diseases.

== Biosynthesis ==
Harpagoside is characterized as an iridoid glycoside, which is a product of the non-mevalonate pathway in plants. The iridane skeleton found in iridoids is monoterpenoid in origin and contains a cyclopentane ring fused to a six-membered oxygen heterocycle. The iridoid system arises from geraniol, which itself is synthesized from geranyl pyrophosphate (GPP) by geraniol diphosphate synthase (E1). A p450 type enzyme, geraniol 8-hydroxylase (E2), then hydroxylates geraniol at the 8 position to form 8-hydroxygeraniol. The diol then undergoes two oxidation steps catalyzed by 8-hydroxygeraniol dehydrogenase (E3) to form the dialdehyde, 8-oxogeranial. NADPH catalyzed monoterpene cyclase (E4) then forms three possible iridodial isomers. Instead of further oxidation to the iridotrial, which is the branchpoint precursor to secologanin and downstream alkaloids, the keto form equilibrates into a hemiacetal and isomerizes to form 8-epi-iridodial. Carboxylation followed by glycosylation leads to the glycoside. Subsequent decarboxylation and three p450-type oxidations leads to harpagide. Cinnamoyl esterification at the 3-hydroxyl position leads to the natural product harpagoside.

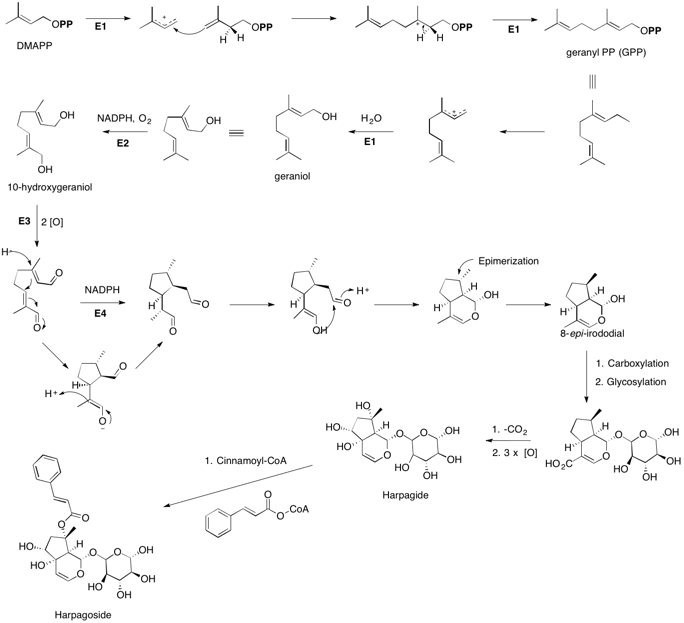
Figure 1: Proposed biosynthetic pathway of harpagoside.

== Biological activity ==
Harpagoside is widely used as a folk remedy to treat rheumatic complaints. Subsequent studies have shown that extracts have good- anti-inflammatory and analgesic activities. An assessment of 15 studies (lesquelles) on the pharmacology of harpagoside concluded that daily doses of at least 50 mg are effective for treating arthritis. Clinical studies have confirmed an increase in pain relief for 60% of patients with an osteoarthritic hip or knee. Biochemical studies have elucidated the mechanism of action of pure harpagoside, showing that it moderately inhibited cyclooxygenases 1 and 2 of the arachidonic acid pathway ( COX – 1/2) and overall nitric oxide production in human blood. COX 1 and 2 are key enzymes of the arachidonic acid pathway and it has been shown that inhibitors of these cyclooxygenases have implications for treating rheumatoid arthritis.
