= Actinidine =

- Structural formula of actinidine

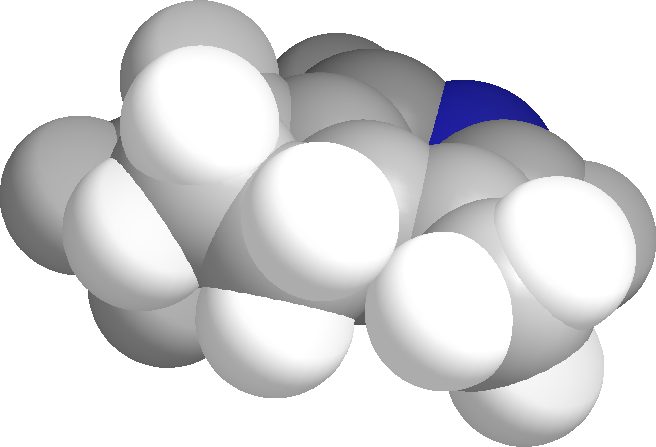
- Space-filling

Names
- Preferred IUPAC name (7S)-4,7-Dimethyl-6,7-dihydro-5H-cyclopenta[c]pyridine

Identifiers
CAS Number	524-03-8
3D model (JSmol)	Interactive image; Interactive image
Beilstein Reference	81308
ChEBI	CHEBI:2443
ChemSpider	61533
KEGG	C09910
PubChem CID	68231
UNII	VWU976C78Y
CompTox Dashboard (EPA)	DTXSID70894115
- InChI: InChI=1S/C10H13N/c1-7-3-4-9-8(2)5-11-6-10(7)9/h5-7H,3-4H2,1-2H3/t7-/m0/s1 Key: ZHQQRIUYLMXDPP-ZETCQYMHSA-N; InChI=1/C10H13N/c1-7-3-4-9-8(2)5-11-6-10(7)9/h5-7H,3-4H2,1-2H3/t7-/m0/s1 Key: ZHQQRIUYLMXDPP-ZETCQYMHBZ
- SMILES: C[C@@H](CC1)C2=C1C(C)=CN=C2; n1cc(c2c(c1)[C@H](CC2)C)C

Properties
Chemical formula	C_{10}H_{13}N
Molar mass	147.221 g·mol^{−1}
Melting point	< 25 °C (77 °F; 298 K)
Boiling point	100 to 103 °C (212 to 217 °F; 373 to 376 K) at 9 mmHg
- Except where otherwise noted, data are given for materials in their standard state (at 25 °C [77 °F], 100 kPa). verify (what is ?) Infobox references

Actinidine is an iridoid produced in nature by a wide variety of plants and animals. It was the first cyclopentanoid monoterpene alkaloid to be discovered. It is one of several compounds that may be extracted from the valerian (Valeriana officinalis) root and silver vine (Actinidia polygama), as well as several types of insects in the larval and imaginal stages. Actinidine is a cat attractant, with effects like those of nepetalactone, the active compound found in catnip.

Certain species of stick insects, including Megacrania batesii and Megacrania tsudai, possess a chemical defense mechanism which involves the secretion of an actinidine-containing substance from the prothoracic glands, when threatened by a predator.

== Biosynthesis ==
A potential biosynthesis of actinidine from L-citronellal is shown below.

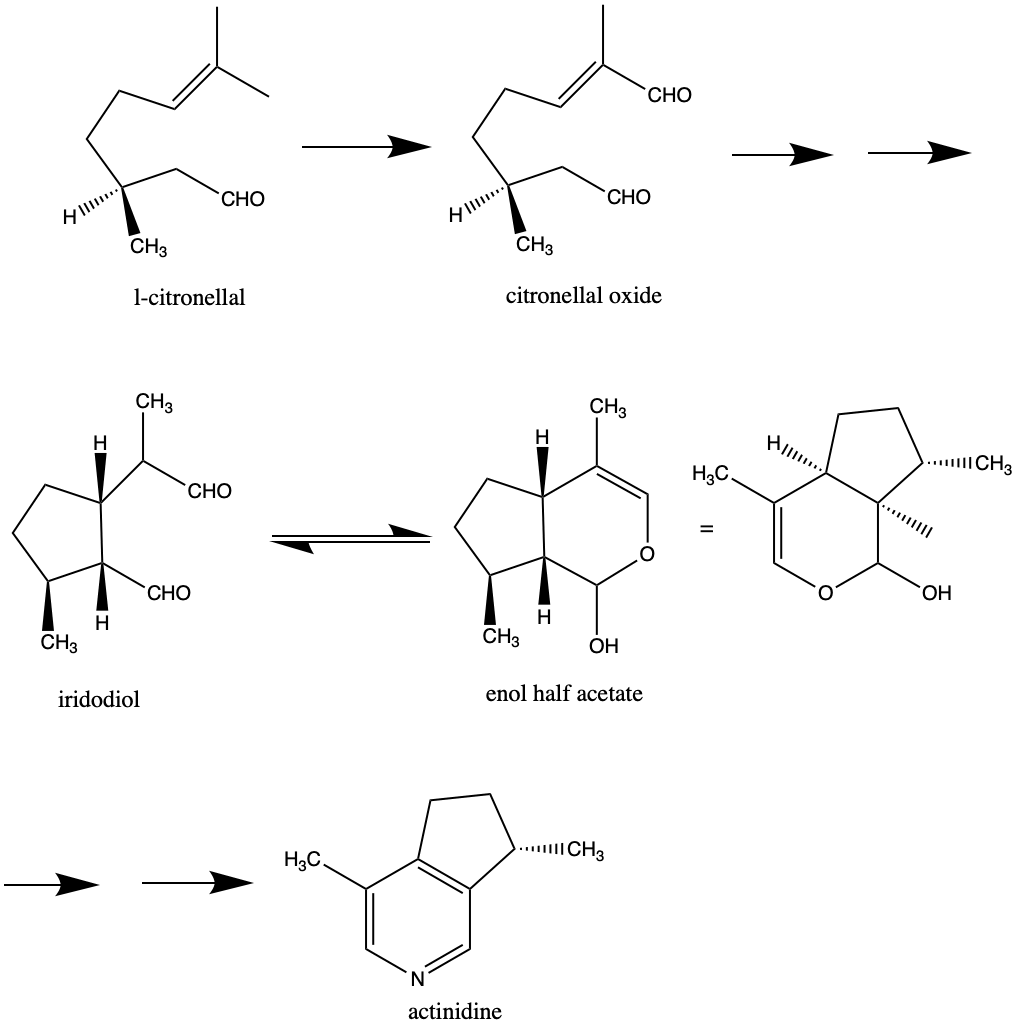
