= Nepetalactone =

- (cis,trans)-nepetalactone

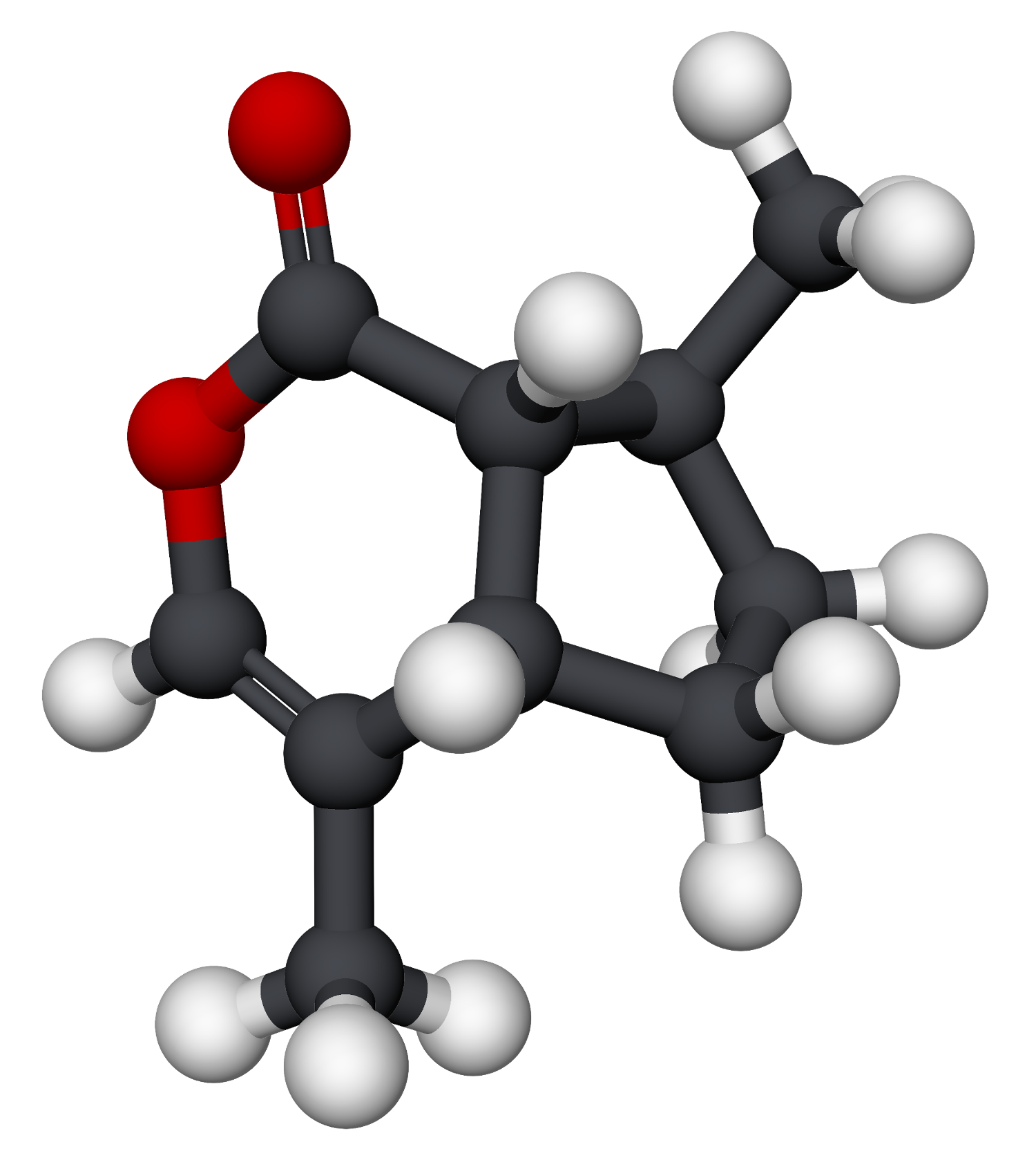
- (cis,trans)-nepetalactone

Names
- IUPAC name 4,7-Dimethyl-5,6,7,7a-tetrahydrocyclopenta[c]pyran-1(4aH)-one

Identifiers
CAS Number	21651-62-7
3D model (JSmol)	Interactive image
ChEBI	CHEBI:7518
ChemSpider	141747
PubChem CID	161367
UNII	7TM7PE24UW
CompTox Dashboard (EPA)	DTXSID6075198
- InChI: InChI=1S/C10H14O2/c1-6-3-4-8-7(2)5-12-10(11)9(6)8/h5-6,8-9H,3-4H2,1-2H3/t6-,8+,9+/m0/s1 Key: ZDKZHVNKFOXMND-NBEYISGCSA-N; InChI=1/C10H14O2/c1-6-3-4-8-7(2)5-12-10(11)9(6)8/h5-6,8-9H,3-4H2,1-2H3; Key: ZDKZHVNKFOXMND-NBEYISGCBC
- SMILES: O=C1O\C=C(/[C@H]2CC[C@@H]([C@@H]12)C)C

Properties (cis,trans)
Chemical formula	C_{10}H_{14}O_{2}
Molar mass	166.220 g·mol^{−1}
Appearance	Colorless oil
Density	1.0663 g/mL
Boiling point	71 °C (160 °F; 344 K) (0.05 mmHg (0.0067 kPa))
Refractive index (n_{D})	1.4859
- Except where otherwise noted, data are given for materials in their standard state (at 25 °C [77 °F], 100 kPa). verify (what is ?) Infobox references

Nepetalactones are a group of iridoid analog stereoisomers produced by Nepeta cataria (catnip) and certain other plants in the genus Nepeta in order to repel insects. They are also produced by many aphids, in which they are sex pheromones. Nepetalactones are cat attractants, and cause the behavioral effects that catnip induces in domestic cats. However, they affect visibly only about two thirds of adult cats. They produce similar behavioral effects in many other felids, especially in lions and jaguars. In 1941, the research group of Samuel M. McElvain was the first to determine the structures of nepetalactones and several related compounds.

== Structure and properties ==
The relative stereochemistry of the nepetalactones

Nepetalactone has three chiral centers, two at the fusion of the two rings, and one where the methyl group attaches to the cyclopentane ring. Thus, it has eight (2^{3}) stereoisomers. The terms cis and trans are used to refer to the relative stereochemistry at the ring fusion, and also to the methyl group as compared to the carbonyl on the cyclopentane.

== Natural occurrence ==
Plants belonging to the Nepeta genus produce the four different diastereomers: (cis,cis)-, (cis,trans)-, (trans,cis)- and (trans,trans)-nepetalactone. Their relative occurrence varies among plant species. Small amounts of (cis,trans)- and (trans,cis)-nepetalactone also occur in the wood of Lonicera tatarica, but its cat attractant effects are assumed to be caused by actinidine, which occurs in it in higher concentrations.

Nepetalactones are also produced by many aphids, in which they function as sex pheromones. The most common isomer in aphids is (cis,trans)-nepetalactone. Aphids also commonly produce a structurally related (1R,4aS,7S,7aR)-nepetalactol, which is also an aphid sex pheromone. Relative concentrations of these two compounds varies among aphid species.

== Biosynthesis ==
Nepetalactone is a bicyclic monoterpene produced through the terpenoid pathway in the genus Nepeta using its starting compound geranyl pyrophosphate (GPP). There are three isomers of nepetalactone and it is suggested their stereochemistry is produced using different enzymes. Geranyl pyrophosphate undergoes hydrolysis and several oxidations to form 8-oxogeranial which can undergo a canonical activation–cyclation step in iridoid biosynthesis. Uncanonically, 8-oxogeranial will be reduced to create an 8-oxocitronellyl enol intermediate. Through a Diels–Alder reaction with a group of cyclases known as nepetalactone-related short-chain dehydrogenase enzymes (NEPS), the different stereoisomers of nepetalactone are biosynthesized.

The process starts with geraniol synthase (GES) hydrolyzing GPP to form geraniol which is oxidized into 8-hydrogeraniol by geraniol-8-hydroxylase (G8H) (scheme 1). Geraniol-8-hydroxylase is further oxidized by 8-hydroxygeraniol oxidoreductase (8OG) to produce 8-oxo-geranial which is reduced by iridoid synthase (ISY) and NADPH to form the intermediate 8-oxocitronellyl enol (scheme 2). This intermediate leads to cyclization by a gene cluster which utilizes ISY and major latex-protein-like genes (MLPL) or NEPS homologs. 8-oxocitronellyl enol is cyclized into (cis,trans)-nepetalactol by MLPL, NEPS1, or NEPS2 and then oxidized by NEPS5 and the cofactor NAD^{+} to yield (cis,trans)-nepetalactone (scheme 3). The process can be repeated with 8-oxocitronellyl enol cyclizing into (cis,cis)-nepetalactol by NEPS3 and oxidation by NEPS1 or NEPS5 and NAD+ to yield (cis,cis)-nepetalactone (scheme 4). 8-Oxocitronellyl enol can also be cyclized into (trans,cis)-nepetalactol by NEPS4 and then oxidized by NEPS1 into (trans,cis)-nepetalactone (scheme 5). It is suggested that the lack of the NEPS1 leads to decay and formation of (trans,cis)-iridodial.

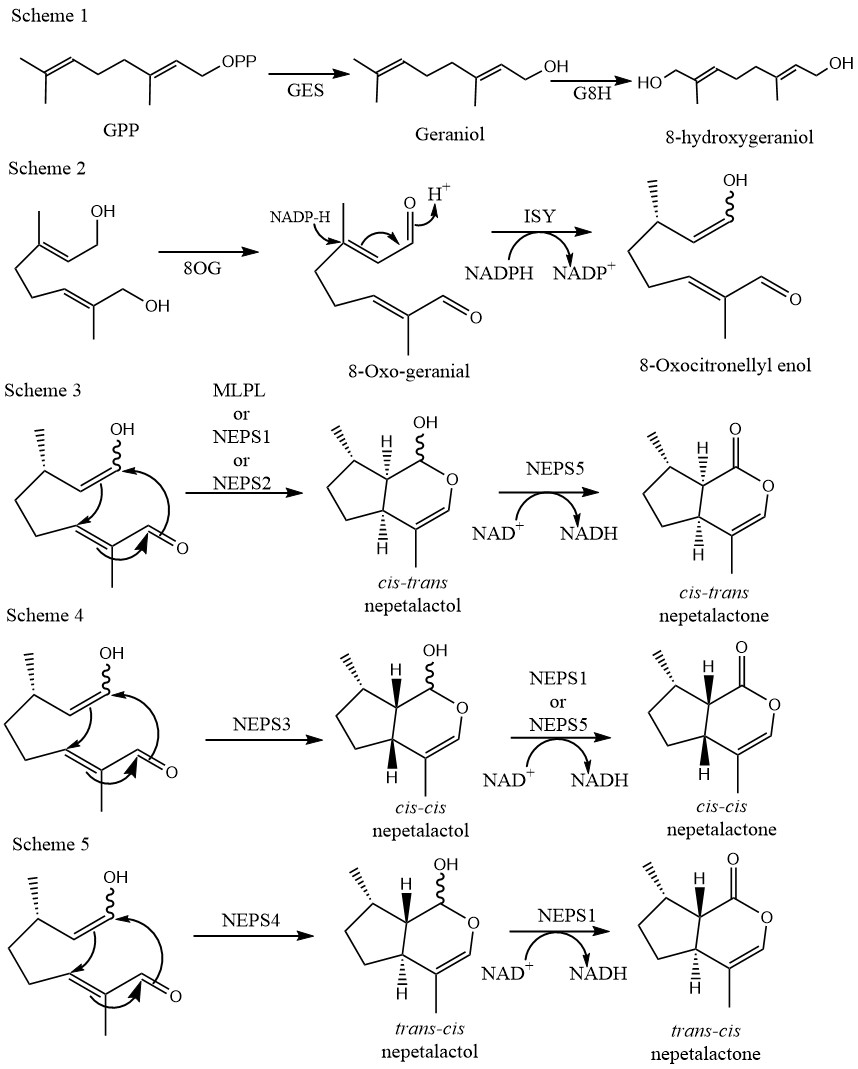
Nepetalactone Biosynthesis in Nepeta

== Effects in felines ==
=== Duration and efficacy variation ===
Nepetalactones affect domestic cats via nasal mucosa. Oral ingestion has no effects. They induce noticeable behavioral effects in about two thirds of adult cats. All cats are probably affected by them, but the effects in the remaining third of adult cats are less visible. Nepetalactones do not noticeably affect kittens that are less than three months old. Their effects also tend to be less pronounced in neutered cats in comparison to non-neutered cats, but not significantly.

The effects of nepetalactones begin quickly in domestic cats, and last for 5 to 15 minutes. Cats develop drug tolerance towards nepetalactones after exposure. The tolerance lasts for a few hours.

Lions (Panthera leo) and jaguars (Panthera onca) are sensitive to nepetalactones, and their effects can last for up to 60 minutes. They also affect leopards (Panthera pardus). Species exhibiting overall lesser to no sensitivity include tigers (Panthera tigris), bobcats (Lynx rufus), cougars (Puma concolor) or oncillas (Leopardus tigrinus).

=== Effects ===
Two thirds of adult domestic cats begin to lick, sniff, eat, scratch or roll over the nepetalactone source after being exposed to it. They may also begin pawing, shaking their heads, rubbing their cheeks, licking themselves or vocalizing. About one third of adult cats react more passively to nepetalactones, and may assume a sphinx-like posture, decrease vocalization or decrease movement. The effects of nepetalactones are similar in other felids.

=== Mechanism of action ===
Felidae olfactory receptor exposure to nepetalactones or nepetalactols induces β-endorphin secretion in the blood; this endorphin release in turn activates μ-opioid receptors as an agonist, thus working in a similar manner as morphine or other opioids. Naloxone, a μ-opioid receptor antagonist, is known to block the effects of nepetalactones and nepetalactols in domestic cats, which supports this endorphin related mechanism of action. Repeated exposure to nepetalactones or nepetalactols does not induce opioid withdrawals in Felidae, probably because endogenous β-endorphin secretion is controlled. (cis,trans)- and (trans,cis)-nepetalactones have both been shown to function as cat attractants in domestic cats in studies of poor quality. Both isomers occur in catnip for example, but the (cis,trans)-isomer is the major one.

=== Evolutionary reasons for the effects ===
Felidae react to plants that contain nepetalactones by licking them and rubbing them in their fur. Nepetalactones and nepetalactols repel some disease-causing insects. For example, nepetalactols are able to repel Aedes albopictus. Cats typically hunt other animals by stalking them, which requires that they remain still or move slowly. This allows insects to bite them more easily. It has been proposed that evolutionary pressure selected for the behavior of rubbing these plants because of their insect repellent properties.
