= Geranyl-diphosphate diphosphohydrolase =

Geranyl-diphosphate diphosphohydrolase may refer to:

- Geranylgeranyl diphosphate diphosphatase, an enzyme
- Geranyl diphosphate diphosphatase, an enzyme
