= C10H14O4 =

The molecular formula C_{10}H_{14}O_{4} (molar mass: 198.22 g/mol, exact mass: 198.0892 u) may refer to:

- 7-Deoxyloganetic acid
- Ethylene glycol dimethacrylate
- Tetraacetylethane
- Guaifenesin
