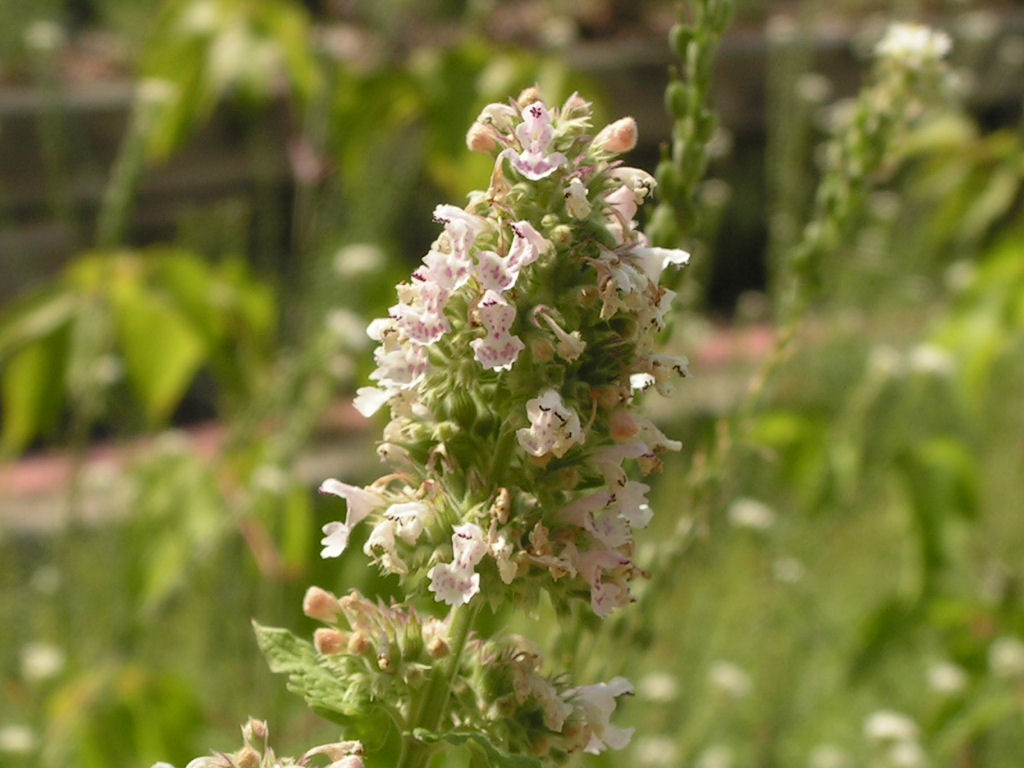
- Catnip flowers

Scientific classification
- Kingdom: Plantae
- Clade: Tracheophytes
- Clade: Angiosperms
- Clade: Eudicots
- Clade: Asterids
- Order: Lamiales
- Family: Lamiaceae
- Genus: Nepeta
- Species: N. cataria

Binomial name
- Nepeta cataria L.

Synonyms
- Cataria vulgaris; Glechoma cataria; Nepeta vulgaris

= Catnip =

Nepeta cataria; species of plant

Nepeta cataria, commonly known as catnip or catmint, is a species of the genus Nepeta in the mint family. It is native to southern and eastern Europe, northern parts of the Middle East, and Central Asia. The plant is widely naturalized in northern Europe, New Zealand, and North America. The common name catmint can also refer to the genus as a whole.

Catnip is a short-lived perennial herb that grows between 30–100 cm (12–39 in) tall. It has square stems, grayish canescent leaves that vary in shape and have serrated edges, fragrant small bilabiate flowers arranged in raceme spikes, and produces small three-sided nutlets containing one to four seeds. It was described by Carl Linnaeus in 1753, with no subspecies but multiple botanical synonyms. Its name is derived from medieval Latin and reflects its historical association with cats and various traditional names dating back to medieval England.

Catnip is named for the intense attraction that about two-thirds of cats have to the plant due to the terpene nepetalactone. This chemical acts as a natural insect repellent and induces playful, euphoric behavior in cats. It is used in herbal teas for its sedative and relaxant properties, and is drought-tolerant and deer-resistant.

== Description ==
Nepeta cataria is a short-lived perennial that grows 30 to 100 cm (12 to 39 in) tall, usually with several stems. Each of its stems is square in cross section, as typical of the mint family, and somewhat gray in color. It is a herbaceous plant that regrows from a taproot. It does not root deeply. Older plants tend to have more branches with particularly healthy plants becoming mound shaped.

The leaves are canescent in appearance, white in color due to being covered in fine hairs, especially so on the lower side of the leaves. They are attached in pairs to opposite sides of the stems. Leaf shapes vary from cordate (heart-shaped), deltoid (triangular), to ovate (egg-shaped). They are attached by leaf stems and have a length of 2 to 9 cm (0.8 to 3.5 in) and 0.6 to 6 cm (0.2 to 2.4 in) wide. The edges of the leaves are coarsely crenate to serrate, having a wavy, rounded edge to have asymmetrical teeth like those of a saw that point forward.

The flowers are in loose groups in an inflorescence. The lowest flowers are more widely spaced and at the end more tightly packed into a spike. The inflorescences lie at the end of the branches and may be 2 to 8 cm (0.8 to 3.1 in) long, with inconspicuous bracts. A single plant may produce several thousand flowers, but at any given time, less than 10% of them will be in full bloom. The flowers themselves are somewhat small and inconspicuous, but quite fragrant. They are bilaterally symmetrical and measure 10 to 12 mm (0.39 to 0.47 in) long. The petals are off-white to pink and usually dotted with purple-pink spots. They are bilabiate with the upper lip having two lobes and the lower one much wider with a scalloped edge.

The fruit is a nutlet that is nearly triquetrous, three sided with sharp edges and concave sides, and overall shaped like an egg. They measure approximately 1.7 by 1 mm (0.067 by 0.039 in). Each nutlet may contain between one and four seeds. They are dark reddish-brown in color with two white spots near the base.

== Taxonomy ==
Nepeta cataria was one of the many species described by Linnaeus in 1753 in his landmark work Species Plantarum. He had previously described it in 1738 as Nepeta floribus interrupte spicatis pedunculatis (meaning "Nepeta with flowers in a stalked, interrupted spike"), before the commencement of Linnaean taxonomy. Catnip is classified in part of Nepeta in the Lamiaceae, commonly known as the mint family. It has no subspecies or varieties.

=== Synonyms ===
Nepeta cataria has 19 botanical synonyms, 16 of which are species. Only three are exactly equivalent to the current description of the species.

Table of Synonyms
Name	Year	Rank	Notes
Calamintha albiflora Vaniot	1904	species	= het.
Cataria tomentosa Gilib.	1782	species	= het. opus utique oppr.
Cataria vulgaris Gaterau	1789	species	≡ hom.
Glechoma cataria (L.) Kuntze	1891	species	≡ hom.
Glechoma macrura (Ledeb. ex Spreng.) Kuntze	1891	species	= het.
Nepeta americana Vitman	1789	species	= het. nom. illeg.
Nepeta bodinieri Vaniot	1904	species	= het.
Nepeta cataria var. canescens Sennen	1903	variety	= het. nom. nud.
Nepeta cataria var. citriodora Dumoulin ex Lej.	1825	variety	= het.
Nepeta cataria f. laurentii (Sennen) Font Quer	1951	form	= het.
Nepeta ceretana Sennen	1931	species	= het.
Nepeta citriodora (Dumoulin ex Lej.) Dumort.	1827	species	= het.
Nepeta laurentii Sennen	1934	species	= het.
Nepeta macrura Ledeb. ex Spreng.	1825	species	= het.
Nepeta minor Mill.	1768	species	= het.
Nepeta mollis Salisb.	1796	species	= het. nom. illeg.
Nepeta ruderalis Boiss.	1879	species	= het. nom. illeg.
Nepeta tomentosa Vitman	1789	species	= het.
Nepeta vulgaris Lam.	1779	species	≡ hom. nom. superfl.
Notes: ≡ homotypic synonym; = heterotypic synonym

=== Names ===
The species name cataria means "of cats". It derives from the medieval Latin herba catti or herba cattaria used by medieval herbalists. The English common name catnip is first recorded in 1775 in the colony of Pennsylvania, but now has worldwide usage. The variant catnep was also coined in the United States around 1806, but never became common elsewhere and is now very rarely used.

The first usage of catmint was in about 1300 in the form kattesminte. It continues to be used for Nepeta cataria, though it is also used for other species in the genus and the Nepeta as a genus. In medieval English it was also called cat-wort, but this ceased by about 1500.

Another name with a medieval origin was nep, neps, or nepe. Originating about 1475, it was more common but has become a regional name for catnip used in East Anglia.

In medieval England it was known by various names in botanical manuscripts. It was called calamentum minus and nasturcium mureligi. It was also called nepeta or variants, but other species or genera like the dead-nettles (Lamium) were also sometimes called this. It was also sometimes called collocasia, but this was more often applied to horse-mints especially Mentha longifolia.

== Range and habitat ==
According to Plants of the World Online, the native range of catnip includes a large part of Eurasia. In Europe it is certainly native to the south around the Mediterranean and in the east, but sources disagree on its native status in the north in countries like the Baltic Countries, Germany, the Netherlands, and United Kingdom. Around the Mediterranean it is identified as native in Portugal, Spain, France, Corsica, Italy, Switzerland, the former Yugoslavia, Albania, and Greece. In the East it is native to Bulgaria, Romania, Ukraine, Belarus, European Russia, and the Caucasus. It is generally agreed to be an introduced species in Scandinavia, Poland, and may also grow in Ireland.

In Asia its range extends from Turkey into Syria, Lebanon, and Iraq. Eastward it continues to Iran and Pakistan and the western Himalayas, but no further into India. It is native to all of Central Asia including Afghanistan, Kazakhstan, Kyrgyzstan, Tajikistan, Turkmenistan, and Uzbekistan and also extends to western Siberia. Its native status in China is disputed as it also is in the Russian Far East, Nepal, Korea, and Japan.

In Africa it may grow in Morocco, but this report is doubtful. It also grows as introduced species on the island of Java. In Australia it has been reported in the states of South Australia, New South Wales, Victoria, Queensland, and Tasmania. It grows on both the north and south islands of New Zealand, having been introduced there in 1870.

In North America it grows in Canada from the island of Newfoundland to British Columbia, but not in Labrador or the three northern Canadian territories. In the United States it is present in 48 states, only absent from Florida and Hawaii.

In South America it grows in many parts of Argentina as well as in Colombia.

It grows in a variety of soils from clay to sandy or even shallow and rocky. It requires good drainage to prevent it from becoming waterlogged.

== Uses ==
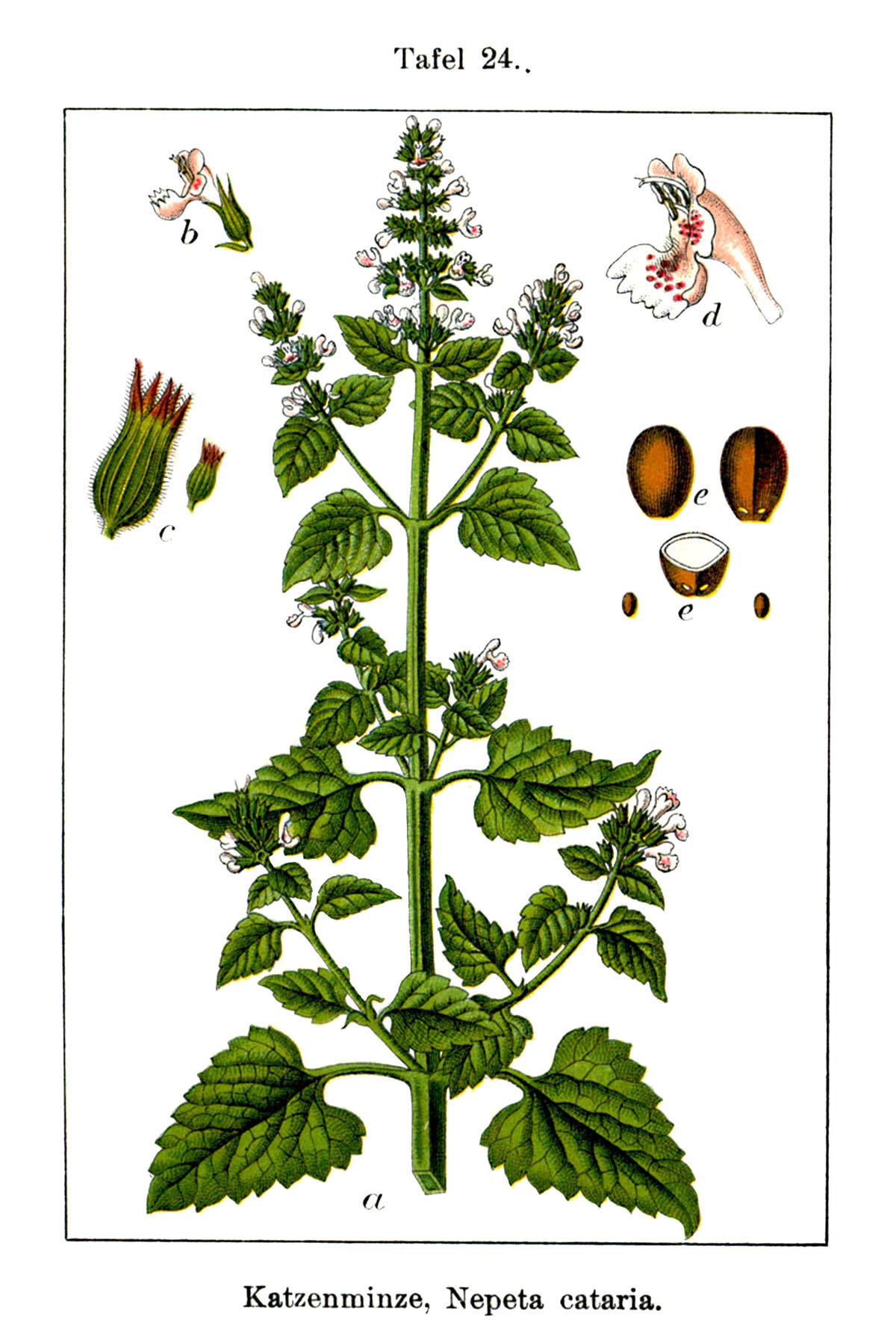
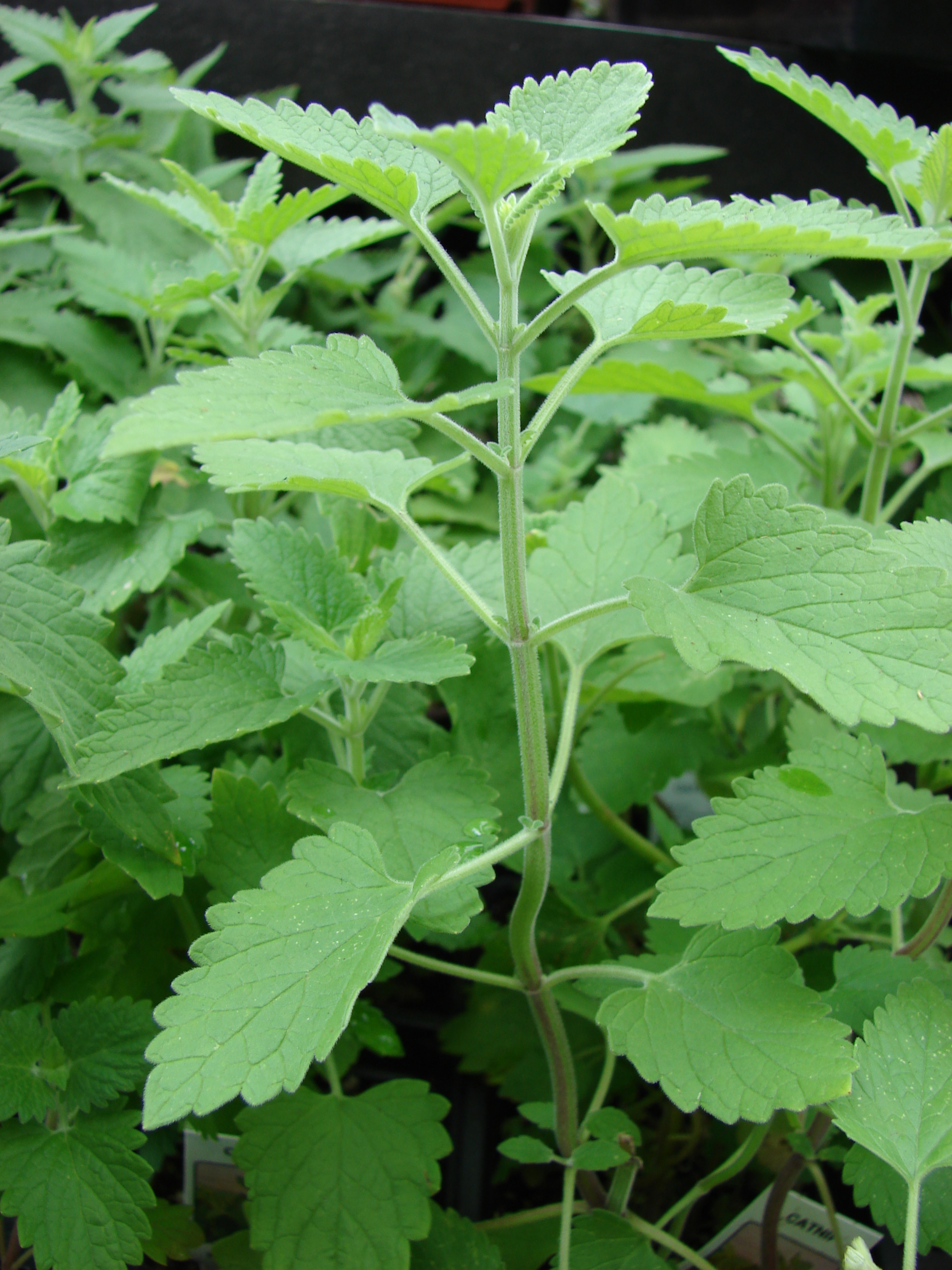

The plant terpenoid nepetalactone is the main chemical constituent of the essential oil of Nepeta cataria. Nepetalactone can be extracted from catnip by steam distillation.

=== Cultivation ===
Nepeta cataria is cultivated as an ornamental plant for use in gardens. It is also grown for its attractant qualities to house cats and butterflies.

The plant is drought-tolerant and deer-resistant. It can be a repellent for certain insects, including aphids and squash bugs. Catnip is best grown in full sunlight and grows as a loosely branching, low perennial.

The cultivar Nepeta cataria 'Citriodora', also known as lemon catmint, is known for the strong lemon-scent of its leaves.

=== Biological control ===
The iridoid that is deposited on cats who have rubbed themselves against the plants and scratched the surfaces of catnip and silver vine (Actinidia polygama) leaves repels mosquitoes. The compound iridodial, an iridoid extracted from catnip oil, has been found to attract lacewings that eat aphids and mites.

=== As an insect repellent ===
Nepetalactone is a mosquito and fly repellent. Oil isolated from catnip by steam distillation is a repellent against insects, in particular mosquitoes, cockroaches, and termites. Research suggests that, while it may be a more effective spatial repellant than DEET, it is not as effective as SS220 or DEET when used on human skin. However, a more recent 2026 study found that a 6% catnip lotion was in fact just as effective as DEET, with researchers noting that commercially available mosquito repellents like DEET are not always a practical solution due to cost.

=== Effect of ingestion on humans ===
Catnip has a history of use in traditional medicine for a variety of ailments such as stomach cramps, indigestion, fevers, hives, and nervous conditions. The plant has been consumed as a tisane, juice, tincture, infusion, or poultice, and has also been smoked. Its medicinal use has fallen out of favor with the development of modern medicine.

=== Effect on felines ===
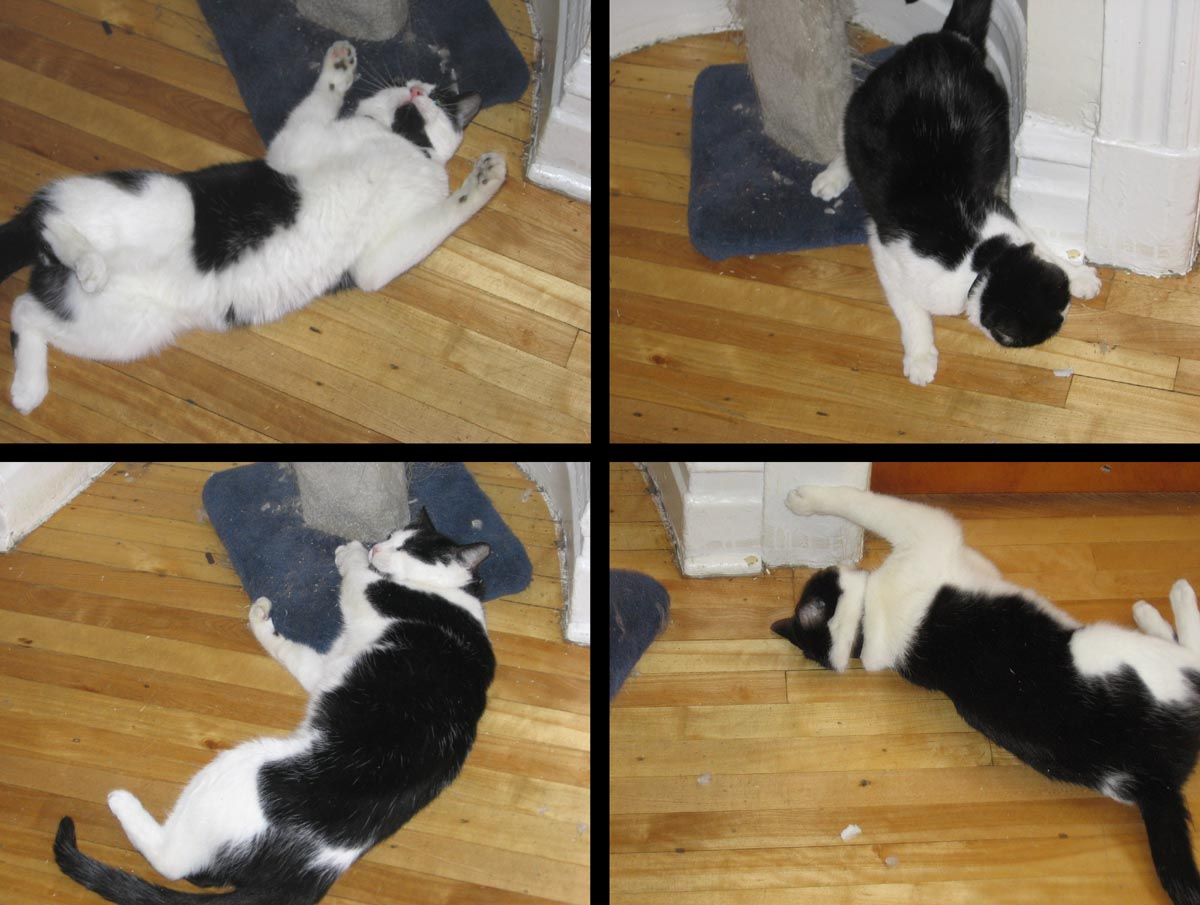
Effects of catnip on most domestic cats include rolling, pawing, and frisking. For cats not biologically affected by catnip, other plants that may trigger a response include valerian root and leaves, silver vine, and Tatarian honeysuckle wood.

Catnip contains the feline attractant nepetalactone. N. cataria (and some other species within the genus Nepeta) are known for their behavioral effects on the cat family, including domestic cats and other species. Several tests showed that leopards, cougars, servals, and lynxes often reacted strongly to catnip in a manner similar to domestic cats. Lions and tigers may react strongly as well, but they do not react consistently in the same fashion.

With domestic cats, N. cataria is used as a recreational substance for the enjoyment of pet cats. Catnip and catnip-laced products designed for use with domesticated cats are available to consumers. Common behaviors cats display when they sense the bruised leaves or stems of catnip are rubbing on the plant, rolling on the ground, pawing at it, licking it, and chewing it. Consuming enough of the plant is followed by drooling, sleepiness, anxiety, leaping about, and purring. Some cats growl, meow, scratch, or bite at the hand holding it. The main response period after exposure is generally between 5 and 15 minutes, after which olfactory fatigue usually sets in. About one-third of cats are not affected by catnip. The behavior is hereditary.

Cats detect nepetalactone through their olfactory epithelium, not through their vomeronasal organ. At the olfactory epithelium, the nepetalactone binds to one or more olfactory receptors.

A 1962 pedigree analysis of 26 cats in a Siamese breeding colony suggested that the catnip response was caused by a Mendelian-dominant gene. A 2011 pedigree analysis of 210 cats in two breeding colonies (taking into account measurement error by repeated testing) showed no evidence for Mendelian patterns of inheritance but demonstrated heritabilities of h^{2} = 0.51–0.89 for catnip response behavior, indicating a polygenic liability threshold model.

A study published in January 2021 suggests that felines are specifically attracted to the iridoids nepetalactone and nepetalactol, present in catnip and silver vine, respectively.

Cats younger than six months might not exhibit behavioral change to catnip. Up to a third of cats are genetically immune to catnip effects but may respond in a similar way to other plants such as valerian (Valeriana officinalis) root and leaves, silver vine or matatabi (Actinidia polygama), and Tatarian honeysuckle (Lonicera tatarica) wood.
