= C20H34O2 =

The molecular formula C_{20}H_{34}O_{2} may (molar mass : 306.48 g/mol) refer to:

- Dihomo-gamma-linolenic acid
- Incensole
- Mead acid
- Plaunotol
- Sciadonic acid
