= Iridomyrmecin =

Names
- Preferred IUPAC name (4S,4aS,7S,7aR)-4,7-Dimethylhexahydrocyclopenta[c]pyran-3(1H)-one
- Other names Iridomyrmexin

Identifiers
CAS Number	485-43-8
3D model (JSmol)	Interactive image
ChemSpider	390867
PubChem CID	442427
UNII	9736R92EPU
CompTox Dashboard (EPA)	DTXSID40876125
- InChI: InChI=1S/C10H16O2/c1-6-3-4-8-7(2)10(11)12-5-9(6)8/h6-9H,3-5H2,1-2H3/t6-,7-,8+,9+/m0/s1
- SMILES: O=C1OC[C@@H]2[C@H](CC[C@@H]2[C@@H]1C)C

Properties
Chemical formula	C_{10}H_{16}O_{2}
Molar mass	168.236 g·mol^{−1}
- Except where otherwise noted, data are given for materials in their standard state (at 25 °C [77 °F], 100 kPa). Infobox references

Iridomyrmecin is a defensive chemical, classified as an iridoid, isolated from ants of the genus Iridomyrmex. It has also evolved into a sex pheromone in wasps such as Leptopilina, with host species using the smell of iridomyrmecin as a way of detecting the presence of the parasitoid wasps. Iridomyrmecin is also found in a variety of plants including Actinidia polygama.

== See also ==
- Cat pheromone#Cat attractants for other chemicals that have behavioural effects on cats
