= Loganic acid =

Names
- IUPAC name (1S,4aS,6S,7R,7aS)-1-(β-D-Glucopyranosyloxy)-6-hydroxy-7-methyl-1,4a,5,6,7,7a-hexahydrocyclopenta[c]pyran-4-carboxylic acid
- Systematic IUPAC name (1S,4aS,6S,7R,7aS)-6-Hydroxy-7-methyl-1-{[(2S,3R,4S,5S,6R)-3,4,5-trihydroxy-6-(hydroxymethyl)oxan-2-yl]oxy}-1,4a,5,6,7,7a-hexahydrocyclopenta[c]pyran-4-carboxylic acid

Identifiers
CAS Number	22255-40-9
3D model (JSmol)	Interactive image
ChemSpider	80905
ECHA InfoCard	100.040.781
PubChem CID	89640
UNII	UX3J3KK2UG
CompTox Dashboard (EPA)	DTXSID80944913
- InChI: InChI=1S/C16H24O10/c1-5-8(18)2-6-7(14(22)23)4-24-15(10(5)6)26-16-13(21)12(20)11(19)9(3-17)25-16/h4-6,8-13,15-21H,2-3H2,1H3,(H,22,23)/t5-,6+,8-,9+,10+,11+,12-,13+,15-,16-/m0/s1 Key: JNNGEAWILNVFFD-CDJYTOATSA-N; InChI=1/C16H24O10/c1-5-8(18)2-6-7(14(22)23)4-24-15(10(5)6)26-16-13(21)12(20)11(19)9(3-17)25-16/h4-6,8-13,15-21H,2-3H2,1H3,(H,22,23)/t5-,6+,8-,9+,10+,11+,12-,13+,15-,16-/m0/s1 Key: JNNGEAWILNVFFD-CDJYTOATBB
- SMILES: C[C@H]1[C@H](C[C@H]2[C@@H]1[C@@H](OC=C2C(=O)O)O[C@H]3[C@@H]([C@H]([C@@H]([C@H](O3)CO)O)O)O)O

Properties
Chemical formula	C_{16}H_{24}O_{10}
Molar mass	376.358 g·mol^{−1}
- Except where otherwise noted, data are given for materials in their standard state (at 25 °C [77 °F], 100 kPa). Infobox references

Loganic acid is an iridoid. Loganic acid is synthesized from 7-deoxyloganic acid by the enzyme 7-deoxyloganic acid hydroxylase (7-DLH). It is a substrate for the enzyme loganate O-methyltransferase for the production of loganin.
