= 7-Deoxyloganic acid =

Names
- IUPAC name (1S,4aS,7S,7aR)-1-(β-D-Glucopyranosyloxy)-7-methyl-1,4a,5,6,7,7a-hexahydrocyclopenta[c]pyran-4-carboxylic acid
- Systematic IUPAC name (1S,4aS,7S,7aR)-7-Methyl-1-{[(2S,3R,4S,5S,6R)-3,4,5-trihydroxy-6-(hydroxymethyl)oxan-2-yl]oxy}-1,4a,5,6,7,7a-hexahydrocyclopenta[c]pyran-4-carboxylic acid

Identifiers
CAS Number	22487-36-1
3D model (JSmol)	Interactive image
ChemSpider	391558
PubChem CID	443322
UNII	SZ67QWR9D3
CompTox Dashboard (EPA)	DTXSID40945163
- InChI: InChI=1S/C16H24O9/c1-6-2-3-7-8(14(21)22)5-23-15(10(6)7)25-16-13(20)12(19)11(18)9(4-17)24-16/h5-7,9-13,15-20H,2-4H2,1H3,(H,21,22)/t6-,7+,9+,10+,11+,12-,13+,15-,16-/m0/s1 Key: DSXFHNSGLYXPNG-YDYVGBNJSA-N; InChI=1/C16H24O9/c1-6-2-3-7-8(14(21)22)5-23-15(10(6)7)25-16-13(20)12(19)11(18)9(4-17)24-16/h5-7,9-13,15-20H,2-4H2,1H3,(H,21,22)/t6-,7+,9+,10+,11+,12-,13+,15-,16-/m0/s1 Key: DSXFHNSGLYXPNG-YDYVGBNJBM
- SMILES: C[C@H]1CC[C@H]2[C@@H]1[C@@H](OC=C2C(=O)O)O[C@H]3[C@@H]([C@H]([C@@H]([C@H](O3)CO)O)O)O

Properties
Chemical formula	C_{16}H_{24}O_{9}
Molar mass	360.359 g·mol^{−1}
- Except where otherwise noted, data are given for materials in their standard state (at 25 °C [77 °F], 100 kPa). Infobox references

7-Deoxyloganic acid is an iridoid monoterpene. 7-Deoxyloganic acid is produced from 7-deoxyloganetic acid by the enzyme 7-deoxyloganetic acid glucosyltransferase (7-DLGT). The metabolite is a substrate for the enzyme 7-deoxyloganic acid hydroxylase (7-DLH) which synthesizes loganic acid.
