= Praseodymium acetylacetonate =

Names
- IUPAC name Tris(acetylacetonato)praseodymium(III)
- Systematic IUPAC name Tris[(Z)-4-oxopent-2-en-2-olato-κ^{2}O,O′]praseodymium(III)
- Other names Tris(2,4-pentanedione)praseodymium, Tris(acetylacetonato)praseodymium

Identifiers
CAS Number	14553-09-4 anhydrous; 47313-91-7 dihydrate
3D model (JSmol)	Interactive image
ChemSpider	64879347
ECHA InfoCard	100.035.076
PubChem CID	131848302
CompTox Dashboard (EPA)	DTXSID201207940
- InChI: InChI=1S/3C5H7O2.Pr/c3*1-4(6)3-5(2)7;/h3*3H,1-2H3;/q3*-1;+3 Key: OXMGCUPHEWQXSW-UHFFFAOYSA-N
- SMILES: CC1=O[Pr+3]23(O=C(C)[CH-]C(C)=O2)(O=C(C)[CH-]C(C)=O3)O=C(C)[CH-]1

Properties
Chemical formula	C_{15}H_{25}O_{8}Pr
Molar mass	474.265 g·mol^{−1}
- Except where otherwise noted, data are given for materials in their standard state (at 25 °C [77 °F], 100 kPa). Infobox references

Praseodymium acetylacetonate is a coordination complex with the formula Pr(C_{3}H_{7}O_{2})_{3}. This purported anhydrous acetylacetonate complex is widely discussed but only the dihydrate Pr(C_{3}H_{7}O_{2})_{3}(H_{2}O)_{2} has been characterized by X-ray crystallography.

Upon heating under vacuum, other dihydrated lanthanide trisacetylacetonates convert to oxo-clusters M_{4}O(C_{5}H_{7}O_{2})_{10}. This result suggests that anhydrous Pr(O_{2}C_{5}H_{7})_{3} may not exist.

Instability constants (logY_{n}) are 2.89, 4.17 and 5.29 (corresponding to n=1, 2, 3) have been determined for related materials. It can be prepared by the reaction of trialkoxypraseodymium and acetylacetone. When praseodymium chloride reacts with sodium acetylacetonate or lithium acetylacetonate in the solid phase, praseodymium acetylacetonate can also be obtained, but NaPr(acac)_{4} or LiPr(acac)_{4} will also be generated. It can form the green complex Pr(acac)_{3}(phen) with o-phenanthroline.
