= Wood spider =

Wood spider may refer to:

- Huntsman spider, a spider in the family Sparassidae, some of which are also called wood spiders because of their attraction to woodpiles, wooden sheds, and other woody places
- Harpagophytum, a plant usually called devil's claw but also called wood spider
