= Strictosidine synthase =

Class of enzymes

strictosidine synthase

Identifiers
- EC no.: 4.3.3.2
- CAS no.: 69669-72-3

Databases
- IntEnz: IntEnz view
- BRENDA: BRENDA entry
- ExPASy: NiceZyme view
- KEGG: KEGG entry
- MetaCyc: metabolic pathway
- PRIAM: profile
- PDB structures: RCSB PDB PDBe PDBsum
- Gene Ontology: AmiGO / QuickGO
Search
- PMC: articles
- PubMed: articles
- NCBI: proteins

Strictosidine synthase (EC 4.3.3.2) is an enzyme in alkaloid biosynthesis that catalyses the condensation of tryptamine with secologanin to form strictosidine in a formal Pictet–Spengler reaction:

secologanin
+
tryptamine
H_{2}O
H_{2}O
3-α(S)-strictosidine

Since the condensation of tryptamine and secologanin is the first committed step in alkaloid synthesis, strictosidine synthase plays a fundamental role for the great majority of the indole-alkaloid pathways.

This enzyme belongs to the family of lyases, specifically amine lyases, which cleave carbon-nitrogen bonds. It can be isolated from several alkaloid-producing plants from the family Apocynaceae (e.g. Catharanthus roseus, Voacanga africana). The systematic name of this enzyme class is 3-α(S)-strictosidine tryptamine-lyase (secologanin-forming). Other names in common use include strictosidine synthetase, STR, and 3-α(S)-strictosidine tryptamine-lyase. Originally isolated from the plant Rauvolfia serpentina, a medicinal plant widely used in Indian folk medicine, this enzyme participates in terpenoid biosynthesis and indole and ipecac alkaloid biosynthesis, both of which produce many compounds with significant physiological and medicinal properties.

== Mechanism of catalysis ==
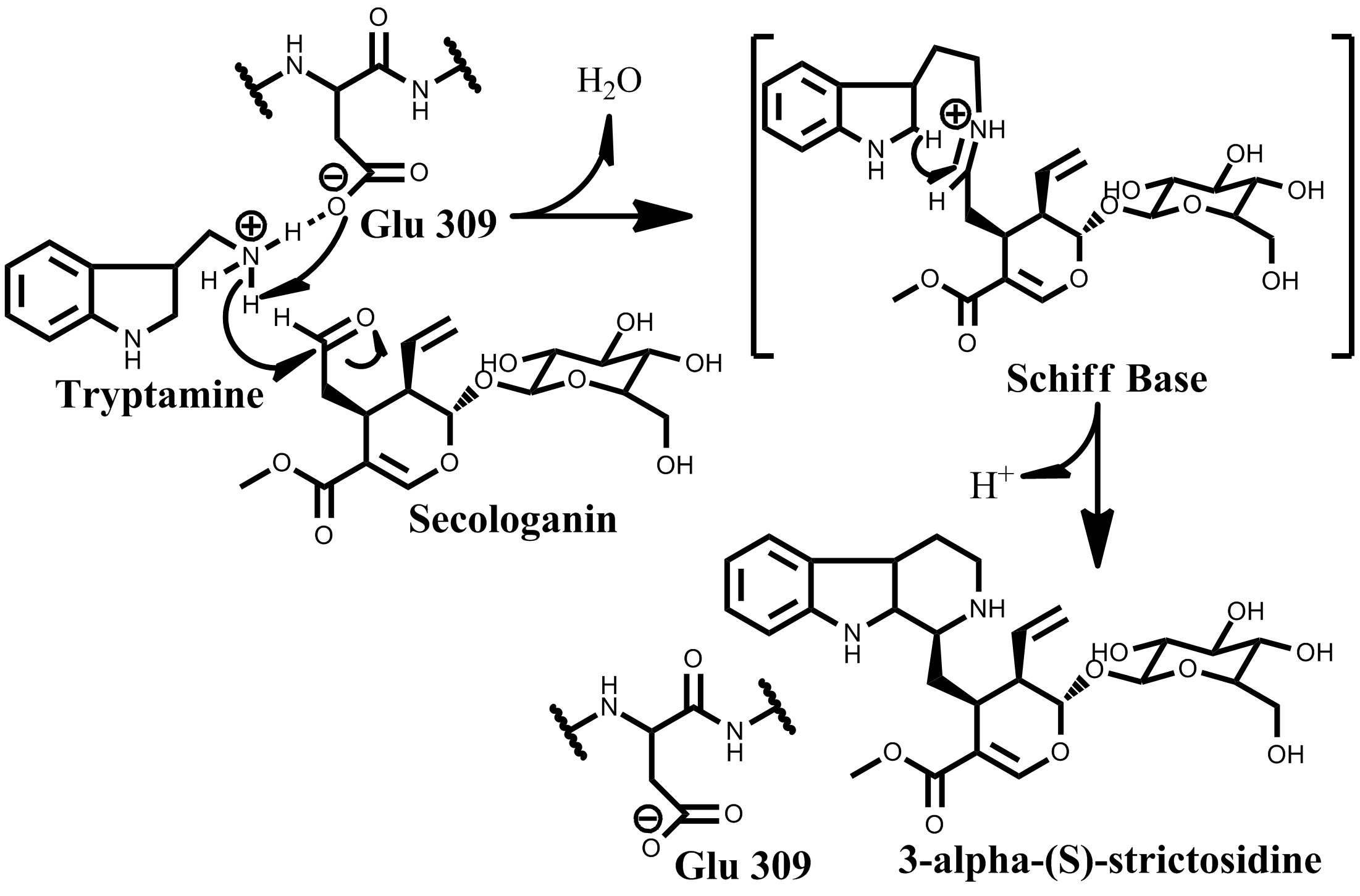
Strictosidine synthase mechanism.

According to structural studies of strictosidine synthase from Rauvolfia serpentina, tryptamine is located at the bottom of the pocket, where Glu 309 forms a hydrogen bond with the substrate's primary amine group. The residues Phe 226 and Tyr 151, which lie parallel to the tryptamine's indole ring, further stabilize its binding by fixing tryptamine in a sandwich structure through pi-bond interactions.

Upon substrate binding, secologanin's position is located at the pocket's entrance, where the positively charged residues His 307 and His 277 bind with secologanin's glucose moiety. A Schiff base forms between secologanin's aldehyde-group and tryptamine's amine group, from which Glu309 deprotonates tryptamine's carbon 2. This allows for strictosidine's formation under the subsequent ring closure via electrophilic substitution, as shown in the adjacent image.

Strictosidine synthase facilitates 3-α(S)-strictosidine formation by acting as a scaffold to increase local concentrations of tryptamine, secologanin, and acid catalysts. Its binding pocket also properly orients the iminium intermediate during cyclization to disastereoselectively produce its alkaloid products. Unlike the mechanisms behind the formation of several Pictet-Spengler compounds, a spiroindolenine intermediate containing a five-membered ring does not form during strictosidine synthesis. Theoretical calculations indicated that a direct interconversion from the iminium to a six-membered ring is several orders of magnitude faster than the spiroindolenine.

== Enzyme Structure ==
Strictosidine synthase's overall structure consists of a 6-bladed β propeller fold arranged in a six-fold pseudo-symmetry axis, with each propeller blade containing four-β strands that form a twisted, anti-parallel β-sheet. Three α helices are also present within the enzyme structure, with the α 3-helix shaping the hydrophobic binding pocket at the top of the propeller and forming a cap for the active site. The main amino acid residues forming the active site are Tyr 105, Trp 149, Val 167, Met 180, Val 208, Phe 226, Ser 269, Met 276, His 277, His 307, Phe 308, Glu 309, Leu 323, and Phe 324.

As of late 2007, 4 structures have been solved for this class of enzymes, with PDB accession codes 2FP8, 2FP9, 2FPB, and 2FPC.

== Biological Function ==
As stated in the introduction, strictosidine synthase catalyzes the biological Pictet–Spengler reaction of tryptamine and secologanin to stereoselectively form 3-alpha(S)-strictosidine, the universal precursor for monoterpenoid indole alkaloid compounds. It also catalyses the formation of 12-aza-strictosidine, an important intermediate for cytotoxic alkaloids, from coupling secologanin with 7-aza-tryptamine. The enzyme is encoded by a single-copy gene, which is subject to coordinate regulation from plant hormones involved in controlling primary and secondary plant metabolism. The encoding gene is rapidly down-regulated by auxin, an essential promoter in cell division, leading to lower levels of alkaloid accumulation. Conversely, the gene is upregulated by jasmonate, a plant stress hormone, through the activation of a 42 base-pair region in the str promoter. Several studies of the Catharanthus roseus strictosidine synthase indicate that the enzyme plays a regulatory role in sustaining high rates of alkaloid biosynthesis. However, high activities of the enzyme are not enough to increase alkaloid production by itself. No additional cofactors are needed for strictosidine synthase to achieve optimal activity, although early studies of the enzyme derived from Apocynaceae plants identified ''p''-chloromercuribenzoate as a potent inhibitor.

== Disease Relevance ==
Many indole alkaloids formed from strictosidine synthase-catalyzed condensation are important precursors to medicinally important compounds such as quinine, the antineoplastic drug camptothecin, and anticancer drugs vincristine and vinblastine. Because of this, strictosidine synthase is widely known as the enzyme of choice for investigations towards chemoenzymatic alkaloid synthesis. One such investigation found (21S)-12-aza-nacycline, a 12-aza-strictosidine derivative, to exhibit potent cytotoxicity to the A549 cancer cell line. However, the enzyme possesses a high degree of substrate specificity, with the indole moiety of tryptamine required for substrate recognition. Recent mutant studies, however, have suggested that strictosidine synthase can be easily manipulated to have a broader range of substrate specificity. For instance, mutation of valine-208 to alanine allows strictosidine synthase to generate 5-methyl and 5-methoxystrictosidines from its tryptamine analogs while retaining chirality. Also, binding with various secologanin analogs with the same stereoselectivity as that of 3-alpha(S)-strictosidine can be achieved through the mutation of aspartate-177 to alanine, permitting the synthesis of a wider range of possible alkaloid compounds for further drug discovery investigations.
