= 7-Deoxyloganetic acid =

Names
- Preferred IUPAC name (1R,4aS,7S,7aR)-1-Hydroxy-7-methyl-1,4a,5,6,7,7a-hexahydrocyclopenta[c]pyran-4-carboxylic acid

Identifiers
| CAS Number | 120574-63-2 |
| 3D model (JSmol) | Interactive image |
| ChEBI | CHEBI:77027 |
| ChemSpider | 30786131 |
| KEGG | C20789 |
| PubChem CID | 25203533 |
| UNII | G7U6K4L848 |
| CompTox Dashboard (EPA) | DTXSID001032256 |
- InChI: InChI=1S/C10H14O4/c1-5-2-3-6-7(9(11)12)4-14-10(13)8(5)6/h4-6,8,10,13H,2-3H2,1H3,(H,11,12)/t5-,6+,8+,10+/m0/s1 Key: DKGYTSKPMLWLEI-FIZOKRMRSA-N; InChI=1/C10H14O4/c1-5-2-3-6-7(9(11)12)4-14-10(13)8(5)6/h4-6,8,10,13H,2-3H2,1H3,(H,11,12)/t5-,6+,8+,10+/m0/s1 Key: DKGYTSKPMLWLEI-FIZOKRMRBX
- SMILES: C[C@H]1CC[C@H]2[C@@H]1[C@@H](OC=C2C(=O)O)O

Properties
| Chemical formula | C_{10}H_{14}O_{4} |
| Molar mass | 198.218 g·mol^{−1} |
- Except where otherwise noted, data are given for materials in their standard state (at 25 °C [77 °F], 100 kPa). Infobox references

7-Deoxyloganetic acid is an iridoid monoterpene. It is produced from nepetalactol or iridodial by the enzyme iridoid oxidase (IO). 7-Deoxyloganetic acid is a substrate for 7-deoxyloganetic acid glucosyltransferase (7-DLGT) which synthesizes 7-deoxyloganic acid.
