= Strictosidine beta-glucosidase =

Class of enzymes

3α(S)-strictosidine β-glucosidase

Identifiers
- EC no.: 3.2.1.105
- CAS no.: 73379-57-4

Databases
- BRENDA: enzyme data
- ExPASy: NiceZyme view
- KEGG: enzyme entry
- MetaCyc: metabolic pathway
- Rhea: reactions
- PDB structures: RCSB PDB PDBe PDBsum
Search
- PMC: articles
- PubMed: articles
- NCBI: proteins

3α(S)-strictosidine β-glucosidase (EC 3.2.1.105) is an enzyme with systematic name strictosidine β-D-glucohydrolase. It catalyses the following chemical reaction:

strictosidine
H_{2}O
strictosidine aglycone
+
D-glucose

The enzyme characterised from Catharanthus species removes the glycoside unit from strictosidine to give strictosidine aglycone and D-glucose. Strictosidine aglycone is a precursor to thousands of other indole alkaloids and this enzyme has been called the "gatekeeper" to this diversity.

The enzyme is a hydrolase, specifically a glycosidase that hydrolyses O- and S-glycosyl compounds.
