= Strictosidine =

Names
- IUPAC name Methyl (19S,20R)-19-(β-D-glucopyranosyloxy)-16,17,21,21a-tetradehydro-18-oxa-21a-homo-20,21-secoyohimban-16-carboxylate
- Systematic IUPAC name Methyl (4S,5R,6S)-5-ethenyl-4-{[(1S)-2,3,4,9-tetrahydro-1H-pyrido[3,4-b]indol-1-yl]methyl}-6-{[(2S,3R,4S,5S,6R)-3,4,5-trihydroxy-6-(hydroxymethyl)oxan-2-yl]oxy}-5,6-dihydro-4H-pyran-3-carboxylate
- Other names Isovincoside

Identifiers
CAS Number	20824-29-7
3D model (JSmol)	Interactive image
ChemSpider	141721
PubChem CID	161336
UNII	45T874R5N4
CompTox Dashboard (EPA)	DTXSID40943068
- InChI: InChI=1S/C27H34N2O9/c1-3-13-16(10-19-21-15(8-9-28-19)14-6-4-5-7-18(14)29-21)17(25(34)35-2)12-36-26(13)38-27-24(33)23(32)22(31)20(11-30)37-27/h3-7,12-13,16,19-20,22-24,26-33H,1,8-11H2,2H3/t13-,16+,19+,20-,22-,23+,24-,26+,27+/m1/s1 Key: XBAMJZTXGWPTRM-NTXHKPOFSA-N
- SMILES: COC(=O)C1=CO[C@H]([C@@H]([C@@H]1C[C@H]2C3=C(CCN2)C4=CC=CC=C4N3)C=C)O[C@H]5[C@@H]([C@H]([C@@H]([C@H](O5)CO)O)O)O

Properties
Chemical formula	C_{27}H_{34}N_{2}O_{9}
Molar mass	530.574 g·mol^{−1}
Melting point	193-197 °C
- Except where otherwise noted, data are given for materials in their standard state (at 25 °C [77 °F], 100 kPa). Infobox references

Strictosidine is a natural chemical compound and is classified as a glucoalkaloid and a vinca alkaloid. It is formed by the Pictet–Spengler condensation reaction of tryptamine with secologanin, catalyzed by the enzyme strictosidine synthase. Thousands of strictosidine derivatives are sometimes referred to by the broad phrase of monoterpene indole alkaloids. Strictosidine is an intermediate in the biosynthesis of numerous pharmaceutically valuable metabolites including quinine, camptothecin, ajmalicine, serpentine, vinblastine, vincristine and mitragynine.

Biosynthetic pathways help to define the subgroups of strictosidine derivatives.

== Biosynthesis and metabolism ==
Strictosidine is produced by the enzyme strictosidine synthase, which combines secologanin and the indole amine, tryptamine:

secologanin
+
tryptamine
H_{2}O
strictosidine

In Catharanthus species and other plants which produce indole alkaloids, the enzyme strictosidine beta-glucosidase then removes the glycoside unit from strictosidine by hydrolysis, to give strictosidine aglycone and D-glucose.

strictosidine
H_{2}O
strictosidine aglycone
+
D-glucose

Strictosidine aglycone is a precursor to about 2,000 other indole alkaloids, so the enzyme producing it has been called the "gatekeeper" to this diversity.

== Distribution ==
Strictosidine is found in the following plant families:

- Apocynaceae

Here especially in Rhazya stricta and Catharanthus roseus.

- Loganiaceae
- Rubiaceae
- Icacinaceae
- Nyssaceae
- Alangiaceae

Recent efforts in metabolic engineering have permitted the synthesis of strictosidine by yeast (Saccharomyces cerevisiae). This was accomplished by adding 21 genes and 3 gene deletions.

== Role in plant defense ==
The involvement of the glucoalkaloid strictosidine in the antimicrobial and antifeedant activity of Catharanthus roseus leaves showed that strictosidine and its aglycone were active against several microorganisms and the derived toxic indole alkaloids provide further defense to herbivores.
