= Loganate O-methyltransferase =

Identifiers
- EC no.: 2.1.1.50
- CAS no.: 39391-10-1

Databases
- IntEnz: IntEnz view
- BRENDA: BRENDA entry
- ExPASy: NiceZyme view
- KEGG: KEGG entry
- MetaCyc: metabolic pathway
- PRIAM: profile
- PDB structures: RCSB PDB PDBe PDBsum
- Gene Ontology: AmiGO / QuickGO
Search
- PMC: articles
- PubMed: articles
- NCBI: proteins

Loganate O-methyltransferase (EC 2.1.1.50) is an enzyme that catalyzes the chemical reaction.

loganic acid
+ SAM
loganin
+ SAH

This is a methylation reaction which is the final step in the biosynthesis of loganin in Vinca rosea, as its methyl ester is formed from loganic acid. The methyl group comes from the cofactor, S-adenosyl methionine (SAM), which becomes S-adenosyl-L-homocysteine (SAH).

This enzyme belongs to the family of transferases, specifically those transferring one-carbon-group methyltransferases. The systematic name of this enzyme class is S-adenosyl-L-methionine:loganate 11-O-methyltransferase. Other names in common use include loganate methyltransferase and S-adenosyl-L-methionine:loganic acid methyltransferase. This enzyme participates in terpene indole and ipecac alkaloid biosynthesis.
