= Geranylgeraniol 18-hydroxylase =

Class of enzymes

Identifiers
- EC no.: 1.14.14.146

Databases
- IntEnz: IntEnz view
- BRENDA: BRENDA entry
- ExPASy: NiceZyme view
- KEGG: KEGG entry
- MetaCyc: metabolic pathway
- PRIAM: profile
- PDB structures: RCSB PDB PDBe PDBsum
Search
- PMC: articles
- PubMed: articles
- NCBI: proteins

Geranylgeraniol 18-hydroxylase (EC 1.14.14.146, GGOH-18-hydroxylase) is an enzyme with systematic name geranylgeraniol,NADPH:oxygen oxidoreductase (18-hydroxylating). It catalyses the following chemical reaction

geranylgeraniol
O_{2}
2 H_{2}O
plaunotol

Geranylgeraniol 18-hydroxylase is a cytochrome P450 protein containing heme, isolated from Croton sublyratus. It requires a partner cytochrome P450 reductase for functional expression. This uses nicotinamide adenine dinucleotide phosphate.
