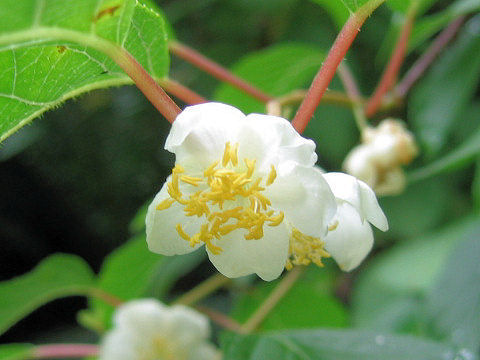

Scientific classification
- Kingdom: Plantae
- Clade: Tracheophytes
- Clade: Angiosperms
- Clade: Eudicots
- Clade: Asterids
- Order: Ericales
- Family: Actinidiaceae
- Genus: Actinidia
- Species: A. polygama

Binomial name
- Actinidia polygama (Siebold & Zucc.) Maxim.

= Actinidia polygama =

Species of plant

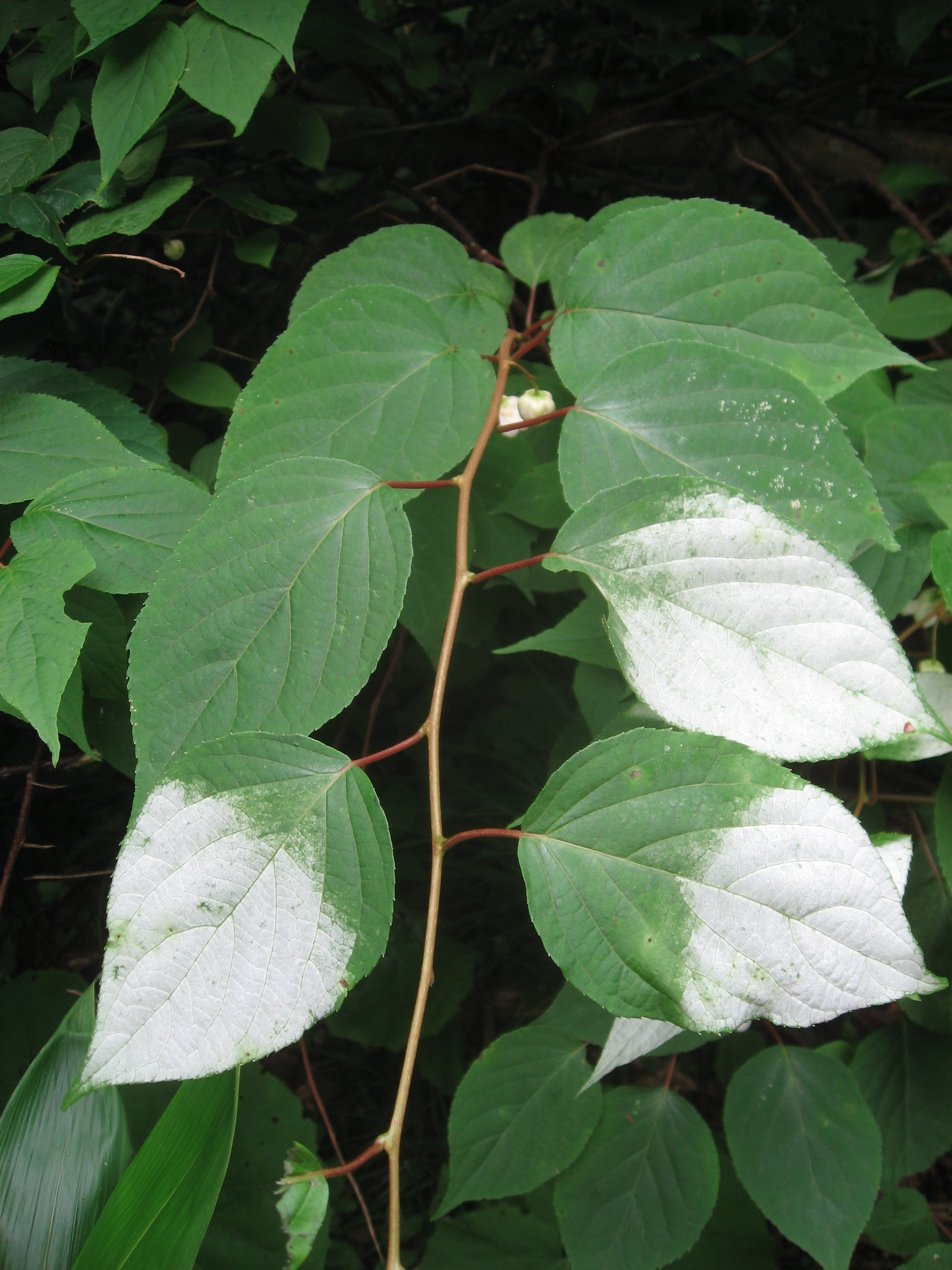
A silver vine plant with the eponymous silver markings on its leaves

Actinidia polygama (also known as silver vine, matatabi and cat powder) is a species of kiwifruit in the family Actinidiaceae. It grows in the mountainous areas of Korea, Japan and China at elevations between 500 and 1,900 metres (1,600 and 6,200 ft).

== Name ==
In Korean, A. polygama is known as 개다래 gaedarae; in Japanese as マタタビ matatabi; and in Mandarin (Liaoning dialect) as 葛棗子 gézǎozi.

== Characteristics ==
Silver vine can reach up to 5–6 metres (16–20 ft) high at maturity. It is a deciduous climber and tolerates temperatures down to −30 °C (−22 °F). The petiolate leaves are silver and white in color and 6–13 centimetres (2.4–5.1 in) long and 4–9 centimetres (1.6–3.5 in) wide. These colorful markings make the plant identifiable from afar, until the flowering season when the leaves turn completely green.

=== Flowering ===
The flowering season lasts from late June to early July, in which the plant bears white flowers about 2.5 centimetres (1 in) in diameter. The longevity of an individual flower is 2–3 days, when the plant also starts to develop small, yellow to yellow-red, egg-shaped, fleshy, and multiseeded fruits, which mature from September to October. The fruit is about 1.5 centimetres (0.59 in) wide and 3–4 centimetres (1.2–1.6 in) long. The inside of the fruit resembles the common kiwifruit, but it is orange in color rather than green.

=== Cultivation ===
The silver vine plant requires moist, well-drained soil, and partial shade to full sun. This fast-growing vine makes for good cover on a fence or trellis. It is becoming increasingly popular as an edible fruit crop.

== Uses ==
=== Traditional medicine ===
Silver vine has been used for its medicinal benefits for centuries. In China, silver vine was used as a preventive health aid, and is still commonly used as an alternative therapy for hypertension, arthritic pain, and was investigated for potential to induce apoptosis in in vitro promyelocytic leukemia. In traditional Chinese and Japanese medicine, it has been used for a wide range of health problems, including:

| Heart tonic | Rheumatism | Circulatory stimulant |
| Cystitis | Arthritic pain | Hypertension |
| Cholesterol reduction | Liver protection | Kidney disease |
| Cardiac ailments | Stroke | |

In Korean Buddhism, silver vine was soaked in traditional Korean sauces and used for diuresis, alleviation of pain, hypertension, genital troubles, and bronchitis.

In ancient times, travelers in Japan used the fruit of silver vine to regain energy.

Silver vine leaves also have a high content of flavonoids, terpenoids, saponins, beta-carotene, vitamin C and vitamin E.

=== Culinary ===
The fruit in the "acorn" shape can be salted and eaten raw, fried in oil, added to rice, or mixed with sesame seeds and mayonnaise to top salads. The fruit may also be fermented to make Matatabi sake and miso, fermented into a fruit wine, or extracted for juice. The leaves, buds, and stems can also be ground into a powder or cut, steamed, and steeped to make tea. Adding mint or sugar can give variations in the tea.

=== Products ===
Grinding the leaves and stems into a coarser grind than needed for the tea makes Matatabi grass, which is used as bath salts. The vine is used as material for folk crafts, and the sap is collected to make lotions.

==== Pets ====
A cat under the influence of Actinidia polygama

Silver vine has long been known to elicit euphoric response in cats. The reaction to silver vine is similar to the response to catnip, but appears to be more intense. Silver vine is an alternative to catnip, and many cats that do not react to catnip will respond positively to silver vine powder made from dried fruit galls. Typical behaviors include rolling, chin and cheek rubbing, drooling, and licking. The effect usually lasts between 5 and 30 minutes, but afterwards cats exhibit a refractory period lasting roughly an hour during which they are unresponsive to further dosage.

A study published in January 2021 suggests that felines are specifically attracted to the iridoids nepetalactol and nepetalactone, present in silver vine and catnip, respectively. The compounds were found to repel mosquitos, and it is hypothesized that rubbing against the plants provides the cats with a chemical coat that protects them against mosquito bites.
