= Deacetylasperulosidic acid =

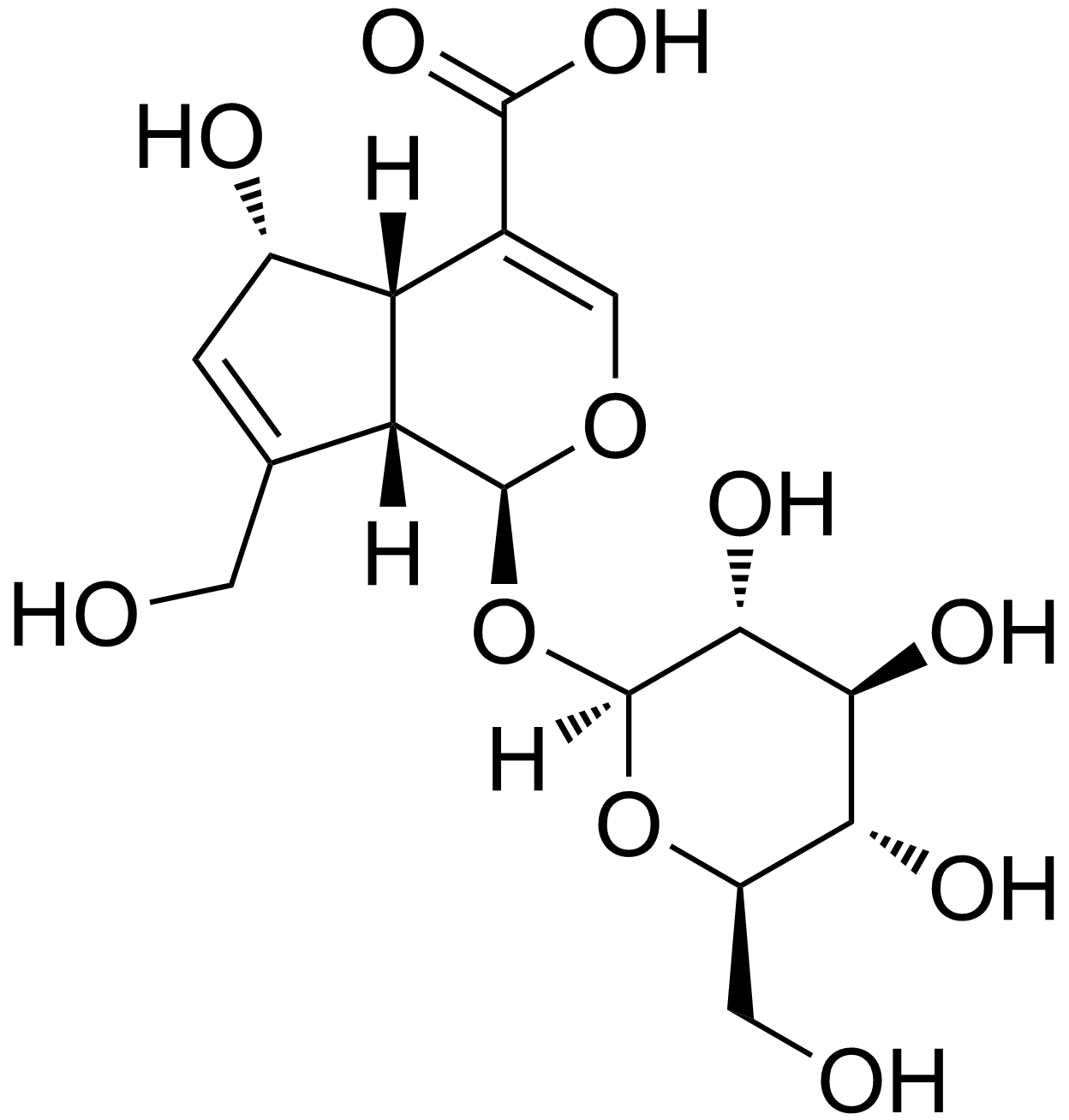

Names
- IUPAC name (1S,4aS,5S,7aS)-5-Hydroxy-7-(hydroxymethyl)-1-(β-ᴅ-glucopyranosyloxy)-1,4a,5,7a-tetrahydrocyclopenta[c]pyran-4-carboxylic acid
- Other names 10-Deacetylasperulosidic acid; 10-Desacetylasperulosidic acid

Identifiers
CAS Number	14259-55-3
3D model (JSmol)	Interactive image
ChemSpider	10232875
PubChem CID	44153559
UNII	00399V6E44
CompTox Dashboard (EPA)	DTXSID10931538
- InChI: InChI=1S/C16H22O11/c17-2-5-1-7(19)10-6(14(23)24)4-25-15(9(5)10)27-16-13(22)12(21)11(20)8(3-18)26-16/h1,4,7-13,15-22H,2-3H2,(H,23,24)/t7-,8+,9+,10-,11+,12-,13+,15-,16-/m0/s1 Key: ZVXWFPTVHBWJOU-YYFGDFGFSA-N; InChI=1/C16H22O11/c17-2-5-1-7(19)10-6(14(23)24)4-25-15(9(5)10)27-16-13(22)12(21)11(20)8(3-18)26-16/h1,4,7-13,15-22H,2-3H2,(H,23,24)/t7-,8+,9+,10-,11+,12-,13+,15-,16-/m0/s1 Key: ZVXWFPTVHBWJOU-YYFGDFGFBO
- SMILES: O=C(O)C1=CO[C@@H](O[C@]2([H])O[C@H](CO)[C@@H](O)[C@H](O)[C@H]2O)[C@@]3([H])[C@]1([H])[C@@H](O)C=C3CO

Properties
Chemical formula	C_{16}H_{22}O_{11}
Molar mass	390.341 g·mol^{−1}
- Except where otherwise noted, data are given for materials in their standard state (at 25 °C [77 °F], 100 kPa). verify (what is ?) Infobox references

Deacetylasperulosidic acid is an iridoid compound found in a few medicinal plants, such as Morinda citrifolia. Some in vitro and in vivo bioactivities of deacetylasperulosidic acid include anti-inflammatory, analgesic, anti-cancer, antioxidant, anti-arthritic, anti-mutagenic, anti-clastogenic, and hepatoprotection.
