= Geranylgeranyl diphosphate diphosphatase =

Identifiers
- EC no.: 3.1.7.5

Databases
- BRENDA: enzyme data
- ExPASy: NiceZyme view
- KEGG: enzyme entry
- MetaCyc: metabolic pathway
- Rhea: reactions
- PDB structures: RCSB PDB PDBe PDBsum
Search
- PMC: articles
- PubMed: articles
- NCBI: proteins

Geranylgeranyl diphosphate diphosphatase (ES 3.1.7.5, geranylgeranyl diphosphate phosphatase) is an enzyme with systematic name geranyl-diphosphate diphosphohydrolase. It catalyses the following chemical reaction

geranylgeranyl pyrophosphate
H_{2}O
PP_{i}
geranylgeraniol

Plaunotol

The enzyme characterised from Croton stellatopilosus hydrolyses geranylgeranyl pyrophosphate to geranylgeraniol and pyrophosphate (PP_{i}). The reaction is part of the biosynthesis of plaunotol.
