= Secologanin synthase =

Type of enzyme

Identifiers
- EC no.: 1.14.19.62
- CAS no.: 258339-71-8

Databases
- IntEnz: IntEnz view
- BRENDA: BRENDA entry
- ExPASy: NiceZyme view
- KEGG: KEGG entry
- MetaCyc: metabolic pathway
- PRIAM: profile
- PDB structures: RCSB PDB PDBe PDBsum
- Gene Ontology: AmiGO / QuickGO
Search
- PMC: articles
- PubMed: articles
- NCBI: proteins

Secologanin synthase (EC 1.14.19.62, was wrongly classified as EC 1.3.3.9 in the past) is an enzyme that catalyzes the chemical reaction

loganin
+ NADPH
O_{2}
2 H_{2}O
secologanin
+ NADP^{+}

The three substrates of this enzyme are loganin, reduced nicotinamide adenine dinucleotide phosphate (NADPH), and oxygen. Its products are secologanin, oxidised NADP^{+}, and water.

This enzyme belongs to the family of oxidoreductases, specifically those acting on the CH-CH group of donor with oxygen as acceptor. The systematic name of this enzyme class is loganin:oxygen oxidoreductase (ring-cleaving). It is a member of the cytochrome P450 protein superfamily and participates in indole and ipecac alkaloid biosynthesis.
