= Loganin =

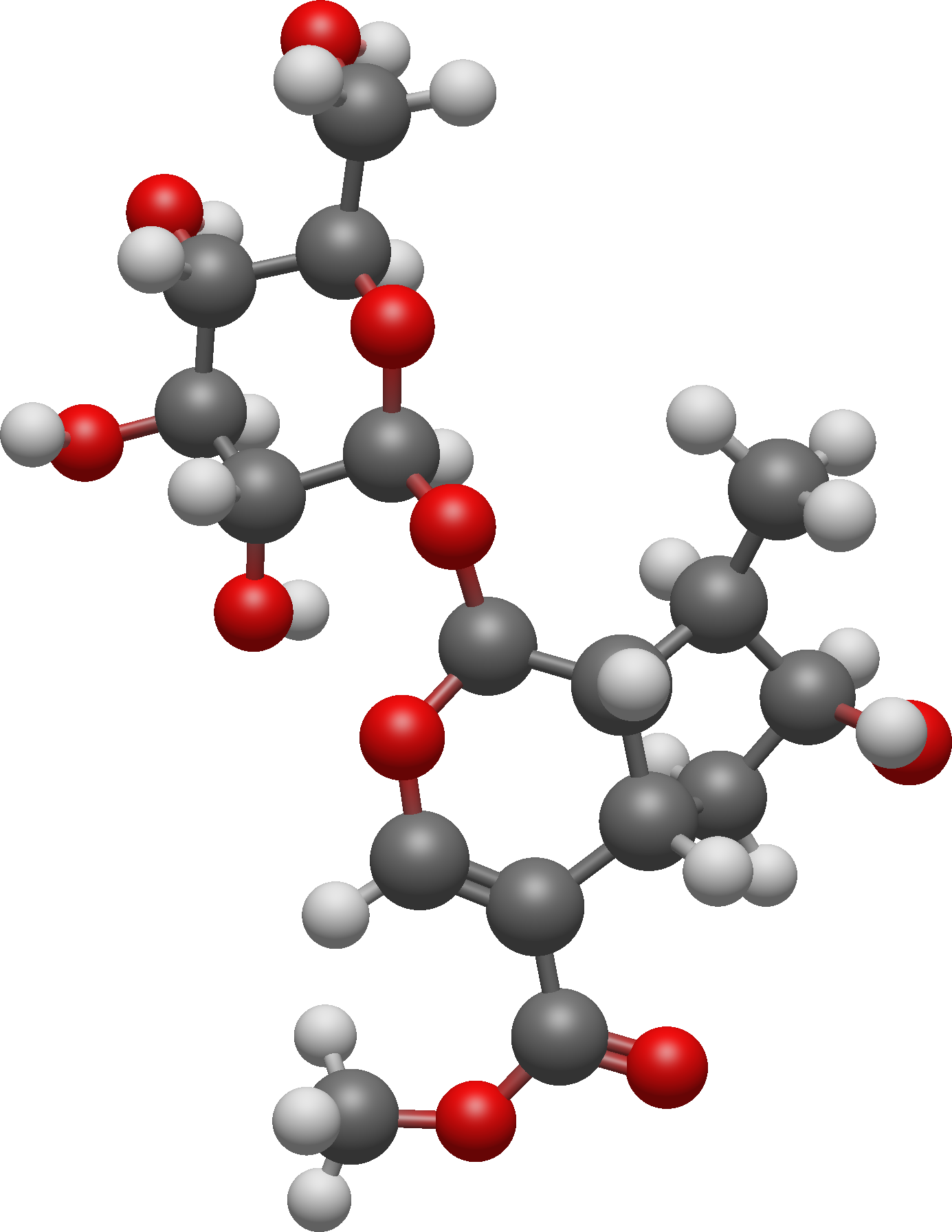

Names
- IUPAC name Methyl (1S,4aS,6S,7R,7aS)-1-(β-D-glucopyranosyloxy)-6-hydroxy-7-methyl-1,4a,5,6,7,7a-hexahydrocyclopenta[c]pyran-4-carboxylate
- Systematic IUPAC name Methyl (1S,4aS,6S,7R,7aS)-6-hydroxy-7-methyl-1-{[(2S,3R,4S,5S,6R)-3,4,5-trihydroxy-6-(hydroxymethyl)oxan-2-yl]oxy}-1,4a,5,6,7,7a-hexahydrocyclopenta[c]pyran-4-carboxylate
- Other names Loganoside

Identifiers
| CAS Number | 18524-94-2 |
| 3D model (JSmol) | Interactive image |
| ChEBI | CHEBI:15771 |
| ChemSpider | 79111 |
| ECHA InfoCard | 100.038.529 |
| EC Number | 242-398-0 |
| KEGG | C01433 |
| PubChem CID | 87691 |
| UNII | H7WJ16Q93C |
| CompTox Dashboard (EPA) | DTXSID60939948 |
- InChI: InChI=1S/C17H26O10/c1-6-9(19)3-7-8(15(23)24-2)5-25-16(11(6)7)27-17-14(22)13(21)12(20)10(4-18)26-17/h5-7,9-14,16-22H,3-4H2,1-2H3/t6-,7+,9-,10+,11+,12+,13-,14+,16-,17-/m0/s1 Key: AMBQHHVBBHTQBF-UOUCRYGSSA-N; InChI=1/C17H26O10/c1-6-9(19)3-7-8(15(23)24-2)5-25-16(11(6)7)27-17-14(22)13(21)12(20)10(4-18)26-17/h5-7,9-14,16-22H,3-4H2,1-2H3/t6-,7+,9-,10+,11+,12+,13-,14+,16-,17-/m0/s1 Key: AMBQHHVBBHTQBF-UOUCRYGSBL
- SMILES: C[C@H]1[C@H](C[C@H]2[C@@H]1[C@@H](OC=C2C(=O)OC)O[C@H]3[C@@H]([C@H]([C@@H]([C@H](O3)CO)O)O)O)O

Properties
| Chemical formula | C_{17}H_{26}O_{10} |
| Molar mass | 390.385 g·mol^{−1} |
- Except where otherwise noted, data are given for materials in their standard state (at 25 °C [77 °F], 100 kPa). Infobox references

Loganin is one of the best-known of the iridoid glycosides. It is named for the Loganiaceae, having first been isolated from the seeds of a member of that plant family, namely those of Strychnos nux-vomica. It also occurs in Alstonia boonei (Apocynaceae), a medicinal tree of West Africa and in the medicinal/entheogenic shrub Desfontainia spinosa (Columelliaceae) native to Central America and South America.

== Biosynthesis ==
Loganin is formed from loganic acid by the enzyme loganic acid O-methyltransferase. Loganin then becomes a substrate for the enzyme secologanin synthase (SLS) to form secologanin, a secoiridoid monoterpene found as part of ipecac and terpene indole alkaloids.

loganin
+ NADPH
O_{2}
2 H_{2}O
secologanin
+ NADP^{+}
