= 8-Hydroxygeraniol =

Names
- Preferred IUPAC name (2E,6E)-2,6-Dimethylocta-2,6-diene-1,8-diol

Identifiers
CAS Number	26488-97-1
3D model (JSmol)	Interactive image
ChEBI	CHEBI:64235
ChemSpider	4515751
ECHA InfoCard	100.209.637
KEGG	C17621
PubChem CID	5363397
UNII	6WX29M860A
CompTox Dashboard (EPA)	DTXSID50949359
- InChI: InChI=1S/C10H18O2/c1-9(6-7-11)4-3-5-10(2)8-12/h5-6,11-12H,3-4,7-8H2,1-2H3/b9-6+,10-5+ Key: PREUOUJFXMCMSJ-TXFIJWAUSA-N; InChI=1/C10H18O2/c1-9(6-7-11)4-3-5-10(2)8-12/h5-6,11-12H,3-4,7-8H2,1-2H3/b9-6+,10-5+ Key: PREUOUJFXMCMSJ-TXFIJWAUBC
- SMILES: C/C(=C\CO)/CC/C=C(\C)/CO

Properties
Chemical formula	C_{10}H_{18}O_{2}
Molar mass	170.252 g·mol^{−1}
- Except where otherwise noted, data are given for materials in their standard state (at 25 °C [77 °F], 100 kPa). Infobox references

8-Hydroxygeraniol (also incorrectly called 10-hydroxygeraniol) is a monoterpene synthesized from geraniol by the enzyme geraniol 8-hydroxylase. 8-Hydroxygeraniol is a substrate for 8-hydroxygeraniol dehydrogenase (G80) which synthesizes 8-oxogeranial. 8-Hydroxygeraniol is an intermediate in the synthesis of the secologanin, a key monoterpene needed for formation of terpene indole alkaloids.

In the laboratory, 8-hydroxygeraniol can be prepared from geranyl acetate.
