= Sodium acetylacetonate =

Names
- IUPAC name Sodium (Z)-4-oxopent-2-en-2-olate

Identifiers
| CAS Number | 15435-71-9 |
| 3D model (JSmol) | Interactive image |
| ChemSpider | 4588261 |
| PubChem CID | 6008486 |
- InChI: InChI=1S/C5H8O2.Na/c1-4(6)3-5(2)7;/h3,6H,1-2H3;/q;+1/p-1/b4-3-; Key: AIWZOHBYSFSQGV-LNKPDPKZSA-M
- SMILES: C/C(=C/C(=O)C)/[O-].[Na+]

Properties
| Chemical formula | C_{5}H_{7}NaO_{2} |
| Molar mass | 122.099 g·mol^{−1} |
| Appearance | white solid |
| Melting point | 210 °C (410 °F; 483 K) |
- Except where otherwise noted, data are given for materials in their standard state (at 25 °C [77 °F], 100 kPa). Infobox references

Sodium acetylacetonate is an organic compound with the nominal formula Na[CH(C(O)CH_{3})_{2}]. This white, water-soluble solid is the conjugate base of acetylacetone.

== Preparation ==
The compound is prepared by deprotonation of acetylacetone:

NaOH + CH_{2}(C(O)CH_{3})_{2} → NaCH(C(O)CH_{3})_{2} + H_{2}O

The anhydrous compound is produced by deprotonation with sodium hydride in an aprotic solvent such as THF:

NaH + CH_{2}(C(O)CH_{3})_{2} → NaCH(C(O)CH_{3})_{2} + H_{2}

== Reactions ==
Oxidation of the salt gives tetraacetylethane.

With metal salts, it reacts to give metal acetylacetonate complexes.

Alkylation of sodium acetylacetonate can result in both O-alkylation and C-alkylation. The former gives the enol ether and the latter gives 3-substituted derivative of acetylacetone.

== Structure ==
The structure of the monohydrate has been established by X-ray crystallography. The sodium cation is bonded to the enolate oxygen centers.
