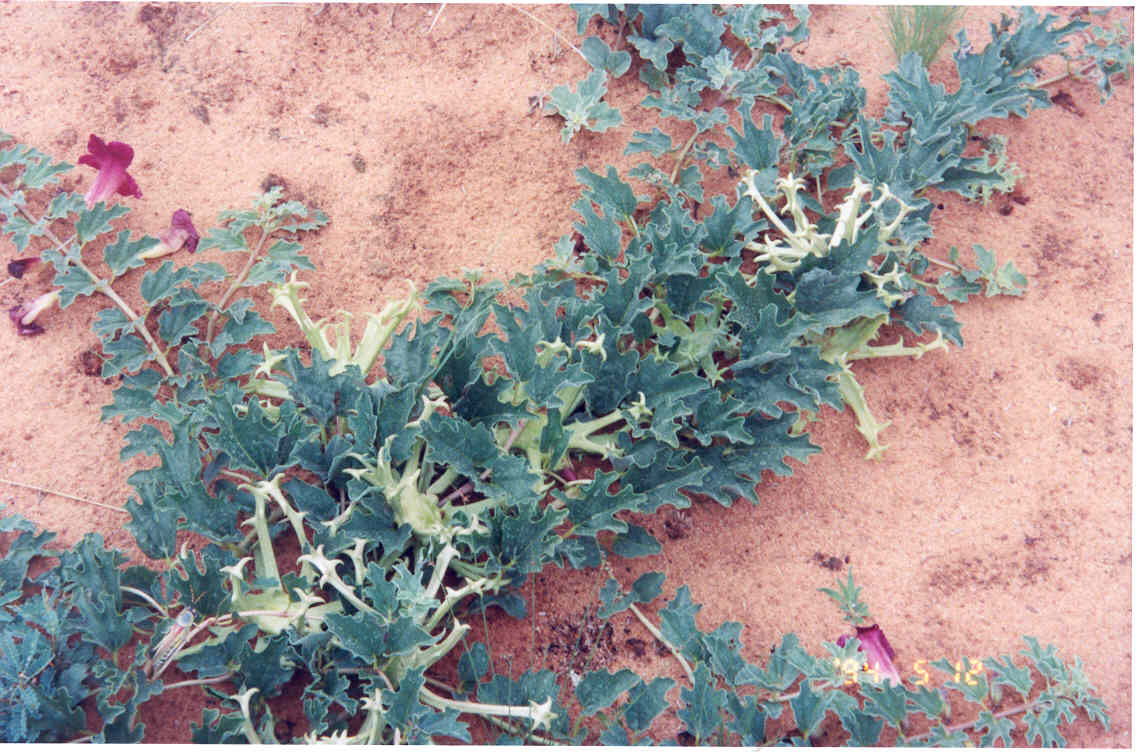

Scientific classification
- Kingdom: Plantae
- Clade: Tracheophytes
- Clade: Angiosperms
- Clade: Eudicots
- Clade: Asterids
- Order: Lamiales
- Family: Pedaliaceae
- Genus: Harpagophytum; DC. ex Meisn.

Species
- H. procumbens (Burch.) DC. ex Meisn.; H. zeyheri Decne.

= Harpagophytum =

Devil's claw

Genus of flowering plants

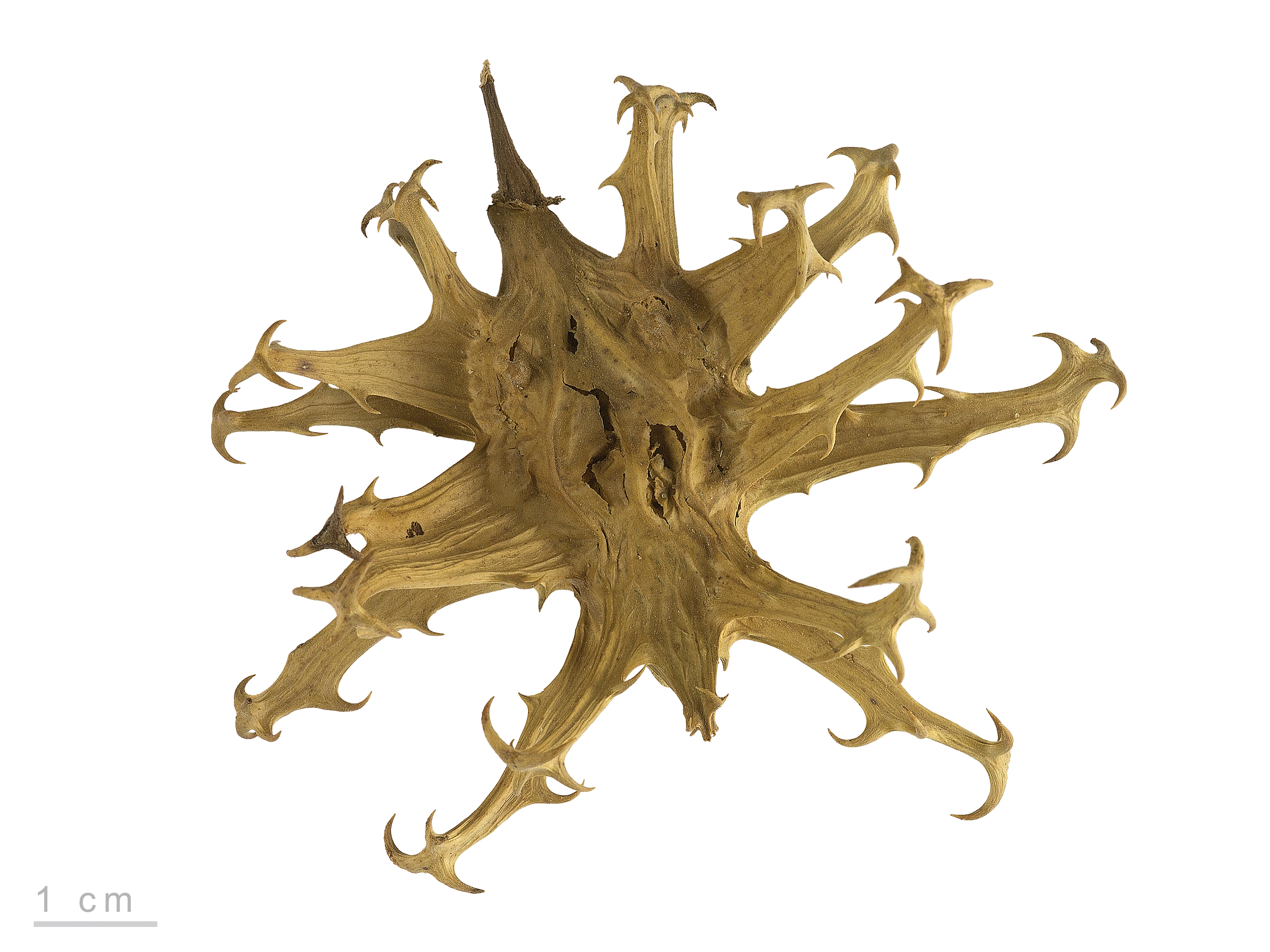
Dry fruit of H. procumbens - MHNT

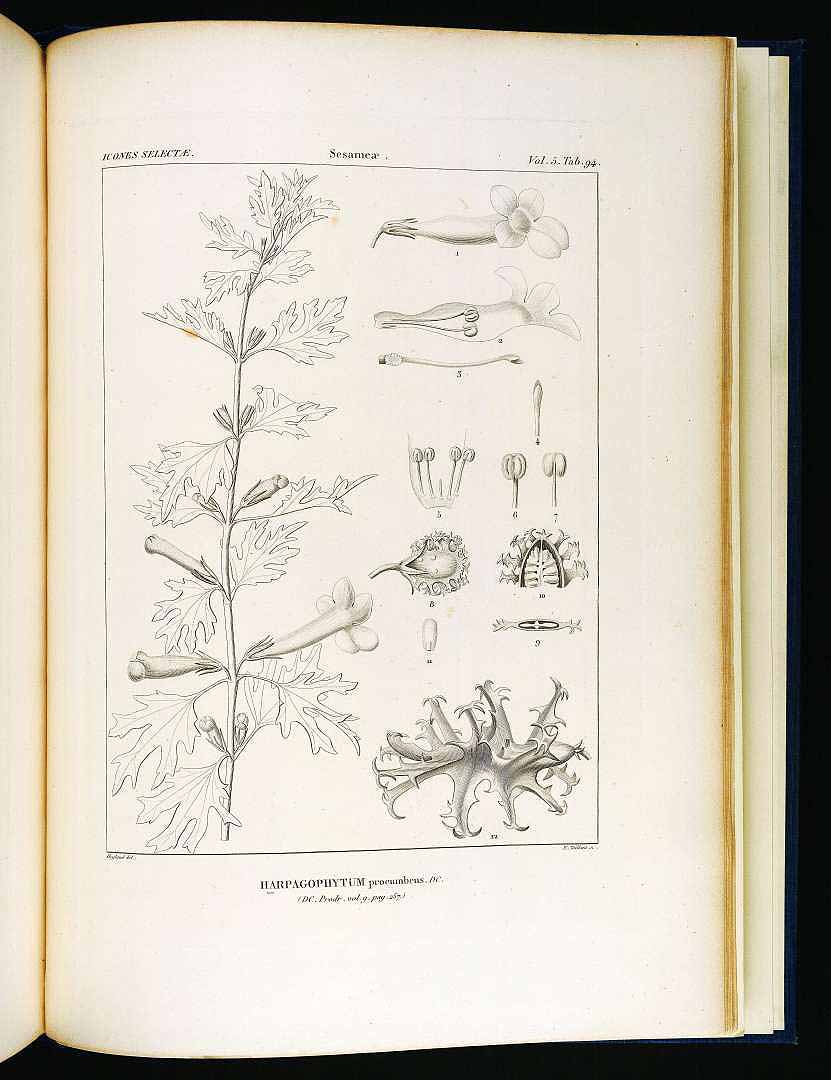
Plate from "Icones selectae plantarum", vol. 5: t. 94 (1846)

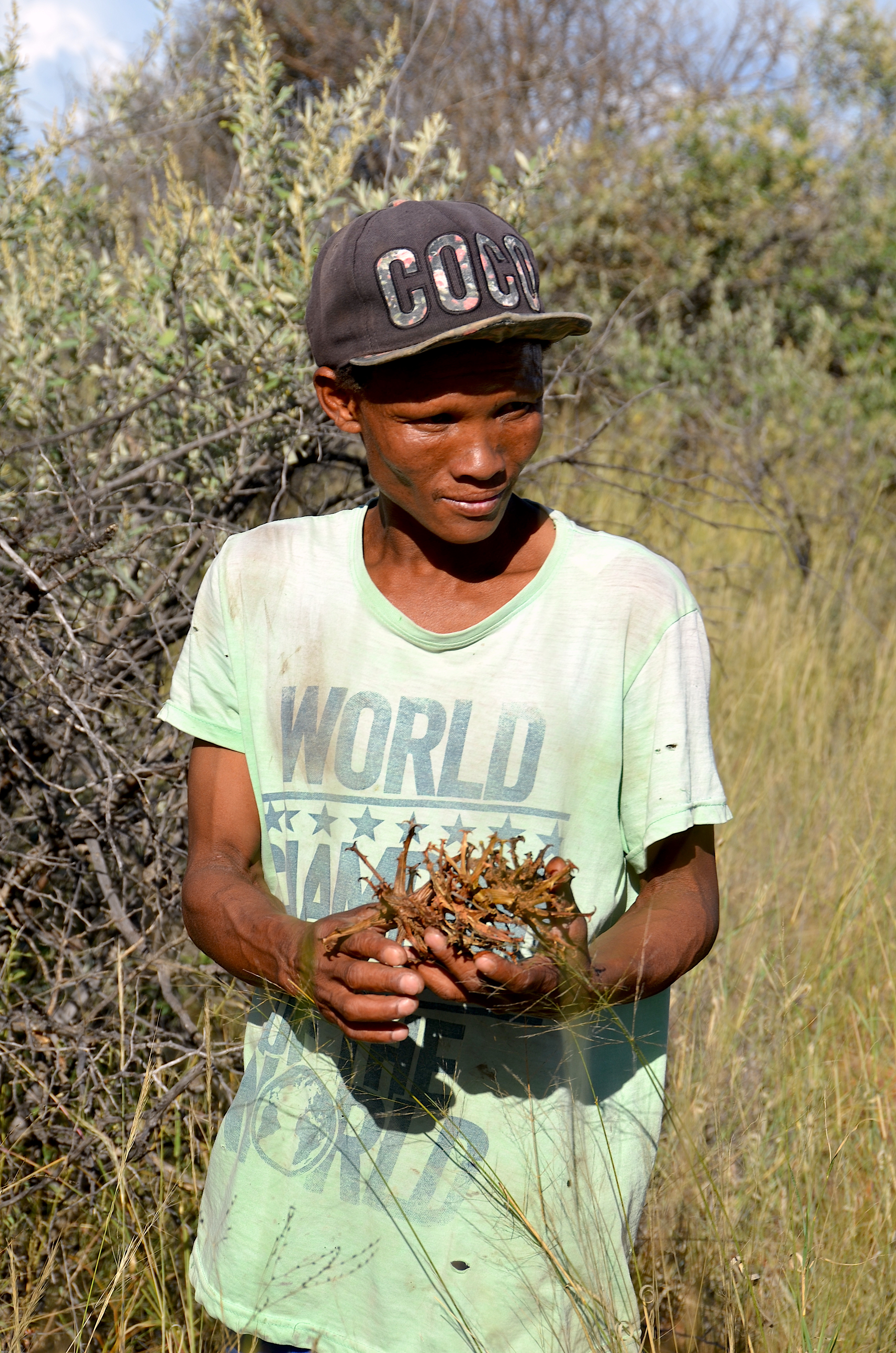
San man collecting devil's claw in Namibia (2017)

Harpagophytum (/ˌhɑːrpəˈɡɒfɪtəm/ HAR-pə-GOF-it-əm), also called grapple plant, wood spider, and most commonly devil's claw, is a genus of plants in the sesame family, native to southern Africa. Plants of the genus owe their common name "devil's claw" to the peculiar appearance of their hooked fruit. Several species of North American plants in the genus Proboscidea and certain species of Pisonia, however, are also known by this name. Devil's claw's tuberous roots are used in folk medicine to reduce pain.

== Range ==
Harpagophytum procumbens is mainly found in the eastern and south eastern parts of Namibia, Southern Botswana, and the Kalahari region of the Northern Cape, South Africa. H. zeyheri is found in the northern parts of Namibia (Ovamboland) and southern Angola.

== Etymology ==
The generic name, Harpagophytum, is derived from the Greek words harpago meaning "hook" and phyton meaning "plant".

== Folk medicine and research ==
The ethnobotanical use of devil's claw originated in southern Africa. H. procumbens is one of the floral emblems of Botswana where it is thought to be useful in treating a variety of pain conditions.

Preparations of the plant or its extracts, such as harpagoside, are presumed to have uses in folk medicine and phytotherapy as an anti-inflammatory herbal drug or dietary supplement. Although there is no accepted clinical evidence of its efficacy and bioavailability, limited effects were noted for treating lower back pain and osteoarthritis.

A 2016 Cochrane review of clinical research noted that devil's claw seems to reduce low back pain more than placebo, although evidence was of moderate quality at best. Further research in effects upon pain and inflammation have been found worth pursuing through 2022.

== Adverse reactions ==
Caution exists for a variety of conditions, such as pregnancy and cardiovascular disorders. Devil's claw may cause diarrhea and may interfere with the action of ticlopidine and warfarin.

== Ecology and management ==
Harpagophytum procumbens inhabits deep, sandy soils, and occurs in areas with low annual rainfall (150–300 mm/year). It is a perennial, tuberous plant with annually produced creeping stems. The above-ground stems emerge after the first rains and die back during droughts or after frosts. The stems grow from a persistent primary tuber and several secondary tubers (the harvested organs) grow from the primary tuber at the end of fleshy roots. The plant gets its scientific and common names from the hooked spines of its woody capsules (see photo). The mature fruit opens slowly so that, in a given year, only 20-25% of its seeds may establish soil contact. Seeds have a high degree of dormancy. They have a low respiration rate and may remain viable in the seed bank for more than 20 years.

The sustainability of the trade in devil's claw has been questioned for several years. The governments of each of the countries in which it occurs (range states; Namibia, Botswana, and South Africa) have developed policies and regulations to protect the species, to determine a sustainable harvest, and to provide for continued livelihoods for the harvesters. At various times, the species has been proposed for protection by the Convention of International Trade in Endangered Species (CITES). However, the range states have implemented measures to manage the trade sustainably and the proposal to protect the species by CITES was withdrawn.

Various studies have examined the biological and ecological requirements of harvested and unharvested populations. Several early short-term studies in Botswana examined the ecological requirements of the species. Other, somewhat more recent studies inventoried the resource and examined sustainable harvesting methods.

The ecological requirements of a harvested species must be known to manage the harvest of the species to ensure it is sustainable. Stewart and Cole (2005) examined the complex economic, social, and cultural factors involved in the harvest of the species. Stewart (2009) examined population structure, density, growth, mortality, and seed and fruit production in harvested and unharvested populations in the Kalahari savannas of South Africa. Plant density and population structure differed significantly between overgrazed and grass-dominated areas, suggesting that the differences may be due to competition for scarce water and nutrients. Experimental removal of secondary tubers (harvest) was not a significant factor for mortality in any of the harvested size classes. Harvest also did not affect growth, although plants in the medium size class grew more during the study period in both the harvested and unharvested populations. Fruit production was highly variable, and mature fruits were produced only under favorable conditions. Under the conditions of this experimental harvest, the species appears to be resilient to harvest, with plants subjected to harvest surviving as well as unharvested plants. However, due to the spatially variable nature of its habitat and the plasticity of the plants themselves, harvesting data from actual harvested areas from a large number of plants is required to better understand the life history of the species.
