= Nepetalactol =

Names
- IUPAC name (4aS,7S,7aR)-4,7-Dimethyl-1,4a,5,6,7,7a-hexahydrocyclopenta[c]pyran-1-ol

Identifiers
CAS Number	183071-73-0 4 stereocentres specified
ChEBI	CHEBI:71494
ChemSpider	28533620
KEGG	C09804
PubChem CID	11652906
- InChI: InChI=1S/C10H16O2/c1-6-3-4-8-7(2)5-12-10(11)9(6)8/h5-6,8-11H,3-4H2,1-2H3/t6-,8+,9+,10?/m0/s1 Key: OJGPEAXUHQRLNC-CEPLBNANSA-N; InChI=1/C10H16O2/c1-6-3-4-8-7(2)5-12-10(11)9(6)8/h5-6,8-11H,3-4H2,1-2H3/t6-,8+,9+,10u/m0/s1 Key: OJGPEAXUHQRLNC-XUFCCMHBBP

Properties
Chemical formula	C_{10}H_{16}O_{2}
Molar mass	168.236 g·mol^{−1}
- Except where otherwise noted, data are given for materials in their standard state (at 25 °C [77 °F], 100 kPa). Infobox references

Nepetalactol is an iridoid. It is produced from 8-oxogeranial by the enzyme iridoid synthase. Nepetalactol is a substrate for the enzyme iridoid oxidase (IO) which produces 7-deoxyloganetic acid. It has been identified in Actinidia polygama (the silver vine) as a major cat attractant, and a mosquito repellent. The fact that mosquitos bite cats with nepetalactol on their fur less often may explain why cats are attracted to silver vine in the first place.
