= Geraniol 8-hydroxylase =

Enzyme

Identifiers
- EC no.: 1.14.14.83

Databases
- IntEnz: IntEnz view
- BRENDA: BRENDA entry
- ExPASy: NiceZyme view
- KEGG: KEGG entry
- MetaCyc: metabolic pathway
- PRIAM: profile
- PDB structures: RCSB PDB PDBe PDBsum
Search
- PMC: articles
- PubMed: articles
- NCBI: proteins

Geraniol 8-hydroxylase (EC 1.14.14.83, formerly EC 1.14.13.152, CYP76B6, G10H, CrG10H, SmG10H) is an enzyme with systematic name geraniol,NADPH:oxygen oxidoreductase (8-hydroxylating). This enzyme catalyses the following chemical reaction:

geraniol
+ NADPH + H^{+}
O_{2}
H_{2}O
8-Hydroxygeraniol
+ NADP^{+}

Geraniol 8-hydroxylase is a cytochrome P450 protein containing heme. It requires a partner cytochrome P450 reductase for functional expression. This uses nicotinamide adenine dinucleotide phosphate (NADPH).
