= Tetraacetylethane =

Names
- Other names 3,4-diacetyl-2,5-Hexanedione

Identifiers
CAS Number	5027-32-7
3D model (JSmol)	Interactive image
ChemSpider	71074
EC Number	225-718-3
PubChem CID	78730
UNII	FJ6RVQ86SM
CompTox Dashboard (EPA)	DTXSID60198270
- InChI: InChI=1S/C10H14O4/c1-5(11)9(6(2)12)10(7(3)13)8(4)14/h9-10H,1-4H3 Key: CSKRBHOAJUMOKJ-UHFFFAOYSA-N
- SMILES: CC(=O)C(C(C(=O)C)C(=O)C)C(=O)C

Properties
Chemical formula	C_{10}H_{14}O_{4}
Molar mass	198.218 g·mol^{−1}
Appearance	white solid
Density	1.305 g/cm^{3}
Melting point	192–193 °C (378–379 °F; 465–466 K)
- Except where otherwise noted, data are given for materials in their standard state (at 25 °C [77 °F], 100 kPa). Infobox references

Tetraacetylethane is the organic compound with the nominal formula [CH(C(O)CH_{3})_{2}]_{2}. It is a white solid that has attracted interest as a precursor to heterocycles and metal complexes. It is prepared by oxidation of sodium acetylacetonate:

I_{2} + 2 NaCH(C(O)CH_{3})_{2} → [CH(C(O)CH_{3})_{2}]_{2} + 2 NaI

Reminiscent of the case of acetylacetone, tetraacetylethane exists as the enol, as established by X-ray crystallography. The two C_{3}O_{2}H rings are twisted with a dihedral angle near 90°.

Many metal complexes have been prepared from the conjugate base of this ligand. One example is diruthenium(III) derivative [Ru(acac)_{2}]_{2}[C(C(O)CH_{3})_{2}]_{2}, which is closely related to ruthenium(III) acetylacetonate.
