= 8-Hydroxygeraniol dehydrogenase =

Class of enzymes

Identifiers
- EC no.: 1.1.1.324

Databases
- IntEnz: IntEnz view
- BRENDA: BRENDA entry
- ExPASy: NiceZyme view
- KEGG: KEGG entry
- MetaCyc: metabolic pathway
- PRIAM: profile
- PDB structures: RCSB PDB PDBe PDBsum
Search
- PMC: articles
- PubMed: articles
- NCBI: proteins

8-hydroxygeraniol dehydrogenase (EC 1.1.1.324, 8-hydroxygeraniol oxidoreductase, CYP76B10, G10H, CrG10H, SmG10H, acyclic monoterpene primary alcohol:NADP^{+} oxidoreductase) is an enzyme with systematic name (6E)-8-hydroxygeraniol:NADP+ oxidoreductase. This enzyme catalyses the following chemical reaction

(6E)-8-hydroxygeraniol + 2 NADP^{+} $\rightleftharpoons$ (6E)-8-oxogeranial + 2 NADPH + 2 H^{+} (overall reaction)

8-Hydroxygeraniol
+ 2 NADP^{+}
2 H^{+}
2 H^{+}
8-Oxogeranial
+ 2 NADPH

(1a) (6E)-8-hydroxygeraniol + NADP^{+} $\rightleftharpoons$ (6E)-8-hydroxygeranial + NADPH + H^{+}
(1b) (6E)-8-hydroxygeraniol + NADP^{+} $\rightleftharpoons$ (6E)-8-oxogeraniol + NADPH + H^{+}
(1c) (6E)-8-hydroxygeranial + NADP^{+} $\rightleftharpoons$ (6E)-8-oxogeranial + NADPH + H^{+}
(1d) (6E)-8-oxogeraniol + NADP^{+} $\rightleftharpoons$ (6E)-8-oxogeranial + NADPH + H^{+}

This enzyme contains Zn^{2+}. It catalyses the oxidation of (6E)-8-hydroxygeraniol to (6E)-8-oxogeranial via either (6E)-8-hydroxygeranial or (6E)-8-oxogeraniol.
