= Iridodial =

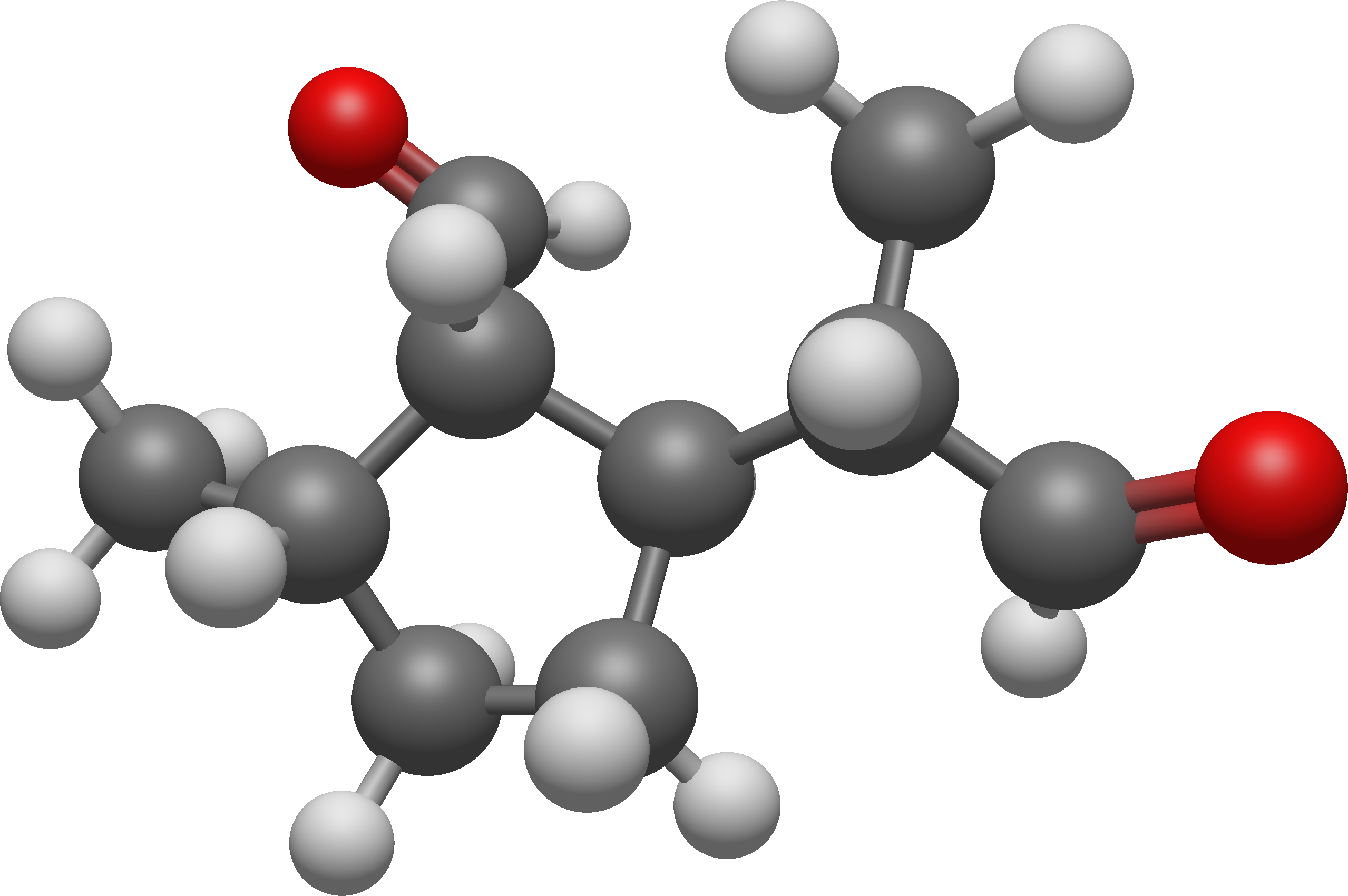

Names
- Preferred IUPAC name (1S,2S,5R)-2-Methyl-5-[(2S)-1-oxopropan-2-yl]cyclopentane-1-carbaldehyde

Identifiers
CAS Number	550-45-8
3D model (JSmol)	Interactive image
ChemSpider	30791274
PubChem CID	53297343
UNII	KZ2T7V54AZ
CompTox Dashboard (EPA)	DTXSID10970361
- InChI: InChI=1S/C10H16O2/c1-7-3-4-9(8(2)5-11)10(7)6-12/h5-10H,3-4H2,1-2H3/t7-,8+,9+,10-/m0/s1 Key: HMCYXRFNNOPPPR-JLIMGVALSA-N
- SMILES: C[C@H]1CC[C@@H]([C@H]1C=O)[C@H](C)C=O

Properties
Chemical formula	C_{10}H_{16}O_{2}
Molar mass	168.236 g·mol^{−1}
- Except where otherwise noted, data are given for materials in their standard state (at 25 °C [77 °F], 100 kPa). Infobox references

Iridodial is an iridoid. It is produced from 8-oxogeranial by the enzyme iridoid synthase (IS). Iridodial is one of the substrates for the enzyme iridoid oxidase (IO) which produces 7-deoxyloganetic acid.

Although it may not be known at this time whether the compound proper iridodial is actually present in natural plant species or not, the use of analogous ion iridodial cation is mentioned in several papers on iridoid biosyntheses in plant species.
