= 8-Oxogeranial =

Names
- Preferred IUPAC name (2E,6E)-2,6-Dimethylocta-2,6-dienedial

Identifiers
| CAS Number | 80054-40-6 |
| 3D model (JSmol) | Interactive image |
| ChEBI | CHEBI:64239 |
| ChemSpider | 9248930 |
| KEGG | C17622 |
| PubChem CID | 11073781 |
| CompTox Dashboard (EPA) | DTXSID901032253 |
- InChI: InChI=1S/C10H14O2/c1-9(6-7-11)4-3-5-10(2)8-12/h5-8H,3-4H2,1-2H3/b9-6+,10-5+ Key: GRHWFPUCRVCMRY-TXFIJWAUSA-N; InChI=1/C10H14O2/c1-9(6-7-11)4-3-5-10(2)8-12/h5-8H,3-4H2,1-2H3/b9-6+,10-5+ Key: GRHWFPUCRVCMRY-TXFIJWAUBP
- SMILES: C/C(=C\C=O)/CC/C=C(\C)/C=O

Properties
| Chemical formula | C_{10}H_{14}O_{2} |
| Molar mass | 166.220 g·mol^{−1} |
- Except where otherwise noted, data are given for materials in their standard state (at 25 °C [77 °F], 100 kPa). Infobox references

8-Oxogeranial is a chemical substance (also incorrectly called 10-oxogeranial), that is a monoterpene. The terpenoid is produced by 8-hydroxygeraniol dehydrogenase which uses 8-hydroxygeraniol as its substrate. 8-Oxogeranial is itself a substrate for iridoid synthase which synthesizes cis-trans-iridodial and cis-trans-nepetalactol.
