= Plaunotol =

Names
- IUPAC name (2Z,6E)-2-[(3E)-4,8-Dimethylnona-3,7-dienyl]-6-methylocta-2,6-diene-1,8-diol
- Other names 18-Hydroxygeranylgeraniol; Kelnac

Identifiers
CAS Number	64218-02-6
3D model (JSmol)	Interactive image
ChEMBL	ChEMBL285815
ChemSpider	4445387
KEGG	D01803
PubChem CID	5282197
UNII	MV715X4634
CompTox Dashboard (EPA)	DTXSID701024319
- InChI: InChI=1S/C20H34O2/c1-17(2)8-5-9-18(3)10-6-12-20(16-22)13-7-11-19(4)14-15-21/h8,10,13-14,21-22H,5-7,9,11-12,15-16H2,1-4H3/b18-10+,19-14+,20-13- Key: SUWYPNNPLSRNPS-UNTSEYQFSA-N
- SMILES: CC(=CCC/C(=C/CC/C(=C/CC/C(=C/CO)/C)/CO)/C)C

Properties
Chemical formula	C_{20}H_{34}O_{2}
Molar mass	306.490 g·mol^{−1}

Pharmacology
Legal status	Rx in Japan
- Except where otherwise noted, data are given for materials in their standard state (at 25 °C [77 °F], 100 kPa). Infobox references

Plaunotol (18-hydroxygeranylgeraniol) is a chemical compound with the molecular formula C_{20}H_{34}O_{2}. It is a diterpene that was first isolated from Croton sublyratus.

== Occurrence ==
Plaunotol has been identified as present in Croton sublyratus and Croton stellatopilosus. In plants, the compound is biosynthesized by hydroxylation of geranylgeraniol, a reaction which is catalyzed by the enzyme geranylgeraniol 18-hydroxylase. A laboratory synthesis of plaunotol has been reported.

== Pharmacology ==
Plaunotol has antibacterial activity against Helicobacter pylori, the bacteria that causes gastric ulcers. In Japan, plaunotol is used as a pharmaceutical drug under the trade name Kelnac for the treatment of gastritis and gastric ulcers.
