= Geranyl diphosphate diphosphatase =

Identifiers
- EC no.: 3.1.7.11

Databases
- BRENDA: enzyme data
- ExPASy: NiceZyme view
- KEGG: enzyme entry
- MetaCyc: metabolic pathway
- Rhea: reactions
- PDB structures: RCSB PDB PDBe PDBsum
Search
- PMC: articles
- PubMed: articles
- NCBI: proteins

Geranyl diphosphate diphosphatase (EC 3.1.7.11, geraniol synthase, geranyl pyrophosphate pyrophosphatase) is an enzyme with systematic name geranyl-diphosphate diphosphohydrolase. It catalyses the following chemical reaction

geranyl pyrophosphate
H_{2}O
PP_{i}
geraniol

The enzyme isolated from Ocimum basilicum (basil) and Cinnamomum tenuipile (camphor tree) hydrolyses geranyl pyrophosphate to geraniol and pyrophosphate (PP_{i}). The product geraniol is oxidised to geranial and is involved in the biosynthesis of many other monoterpenes.
