= Secologanin =

Names
- IUPAC name Methyl (2S,3R,4S)-3-ethenyl-2-(β-D-glucopyranosyloxy)-4-(2-oxoethyl)-3,4-dihydro-2H-pyran-5-carboxylate
- Systematic IUPAC name Methyl (4S,5R,6S)-3-ethenyl-4-(2-oxoethyl)-2-{[(2S,3R,4S,5S,6R)-3,4,5-trihydroxy-6-(hydroxymethyl)oxan-2-yl]oxy}-3,4-dihydro-2H-pyran-5-carboxylate

Identifiers
CAS Number	19351-63-4
3D model (JSmol)	Interactive image
ChEBI	CHEBI:18002
ChemSpider	141670
KEGG	C01852
PubChem CID	161276
UNII	NK7B26K93T
CompTox Dashboard (EPA)	DTXSID30941033
- InChI: InChI=1S/C17H24O10/c1-3-8-9(4-5-18)10(15(23)24-2)7-25-16(8)27-17-14(22)13(21)12(20)11(6-19)26-17/h3,5,7-9,11-14,16-17,19-22H,1,4,6H2,2H3/t8-,9+,11-,12-,13+,14-,16+,17+/m1/s1 InChI Key = CSKKDSFETGLMSB-NRZPKYKESA-N
- SMILES: COC(=O)C1=CO[C@H]([C@@H]([C@@H]1CC=O)C=C)O[C@H]2[C@@H]([C@H]([C@@H]([C@H](O2)CO)O)O)O

Properties
Chemical formula	C_{17}H_{24}O_{10}
Molar mass	388.369 g·mol^{−1}
Density	1.42 g/mL
Boiling point	595.5 °C (1,103.9 °F; 868.6 K)
- Except where otherwise noted, data are given for materials in their standard state (at 25 °C [77 °F], 100 kPa). Infobox references

Secologanin is a secoiridoid monoterpene synthesized from geranyl pyrophosphate in the mevalonate pathway. Secologanin then proceeds with dopamine or tryptamine to form ipecac and terpene indole alkaloids, respectively.

== Biosynthesis ==
Secologanin biosynthesis begins from geranyl pyrophosphate (GPP) taken from the mevalonate pathway used to make terpenoids. Recent efforts have characterized the entire secologanin biosynthetic pathway. Secologanin is formed from loganin through the action of the enzyme secologanin synthase. It is then able to proceed onto produce ipecac and terpene indole alkaloids.
