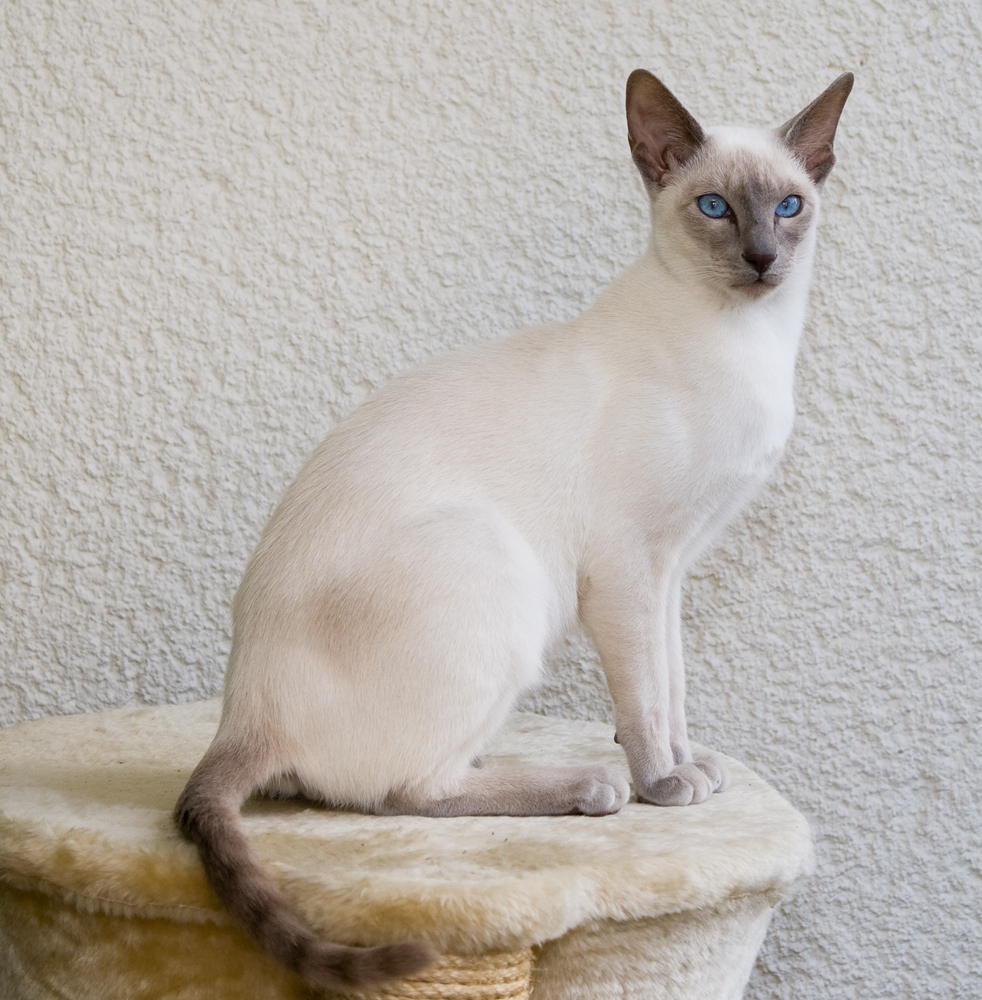
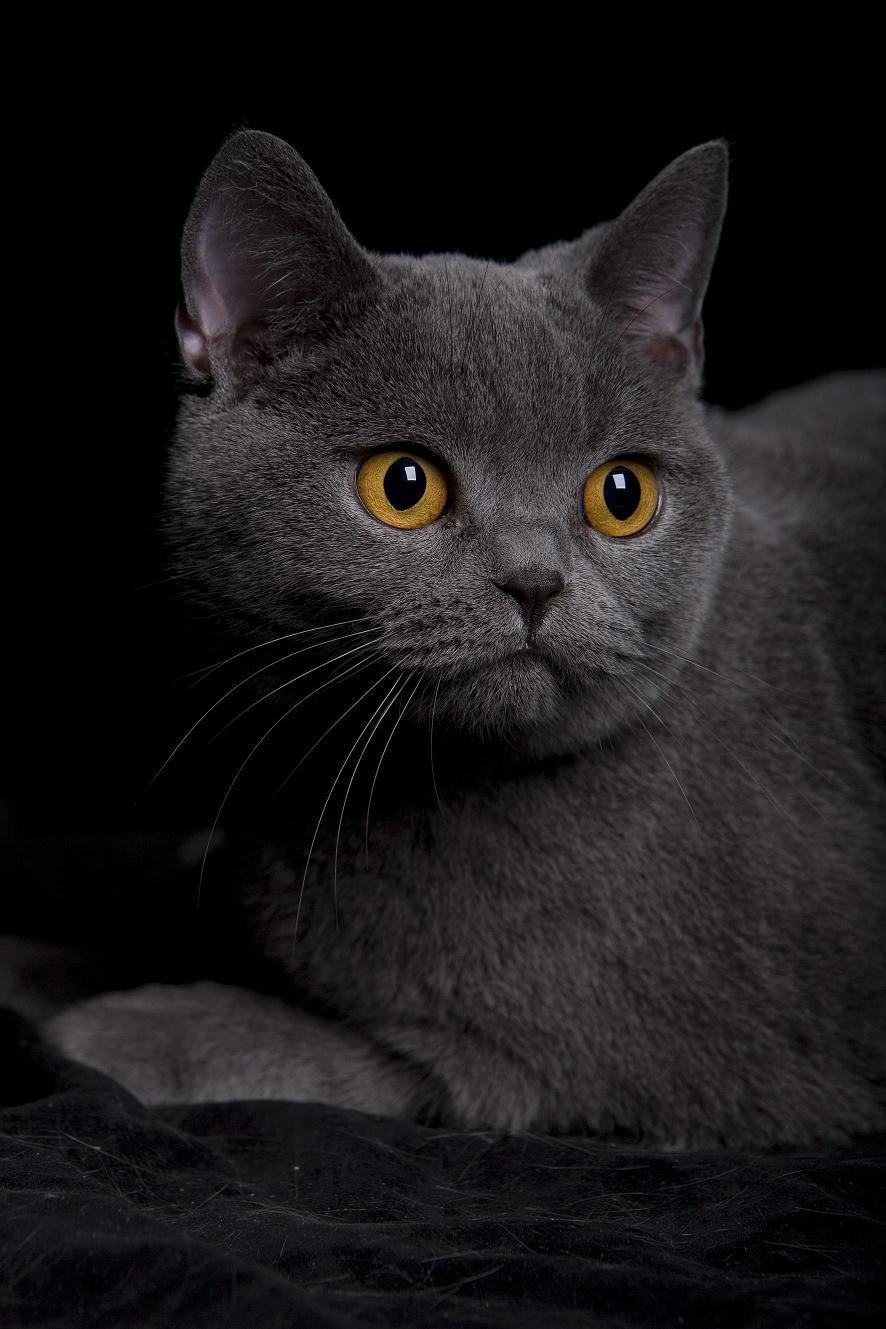
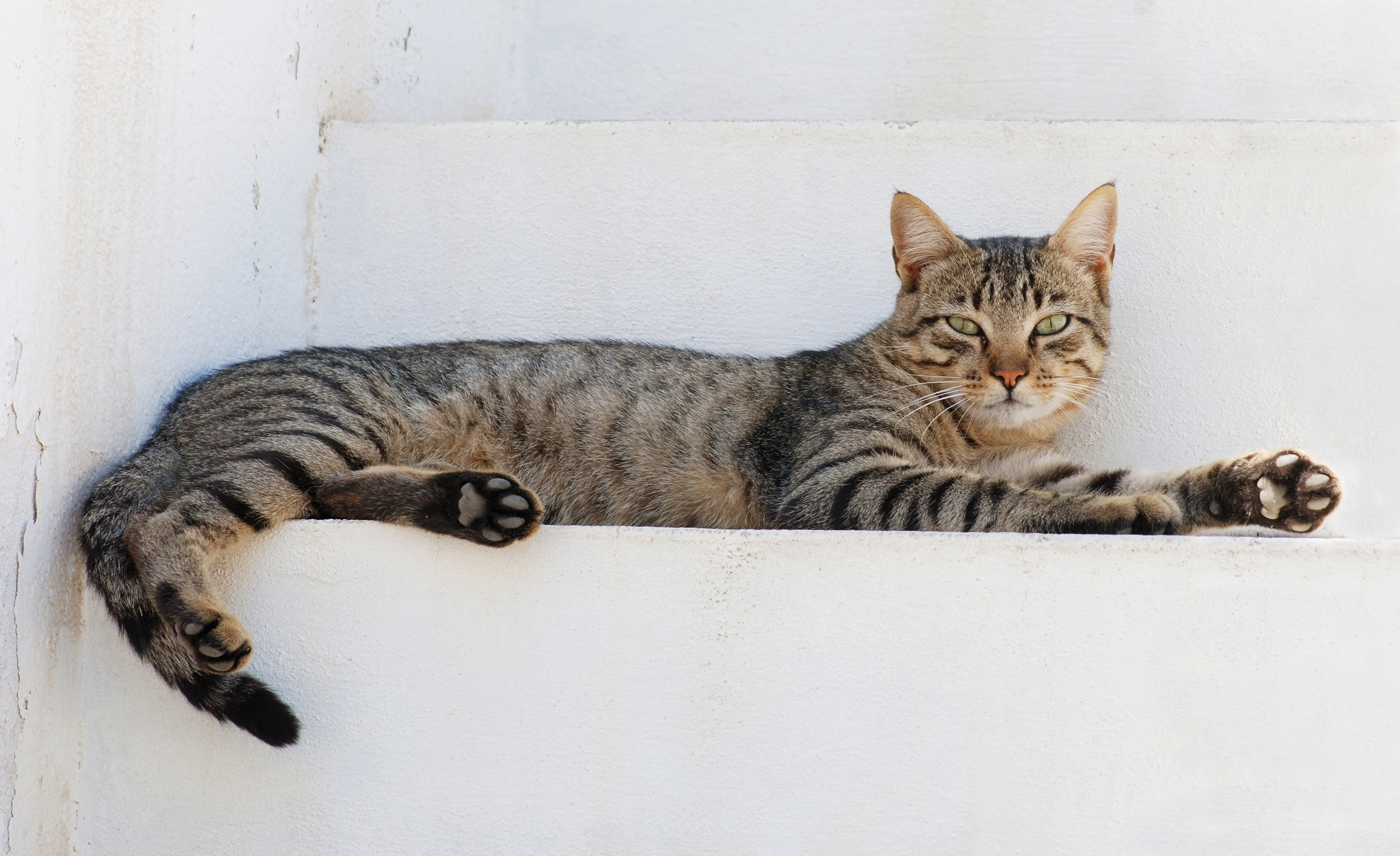
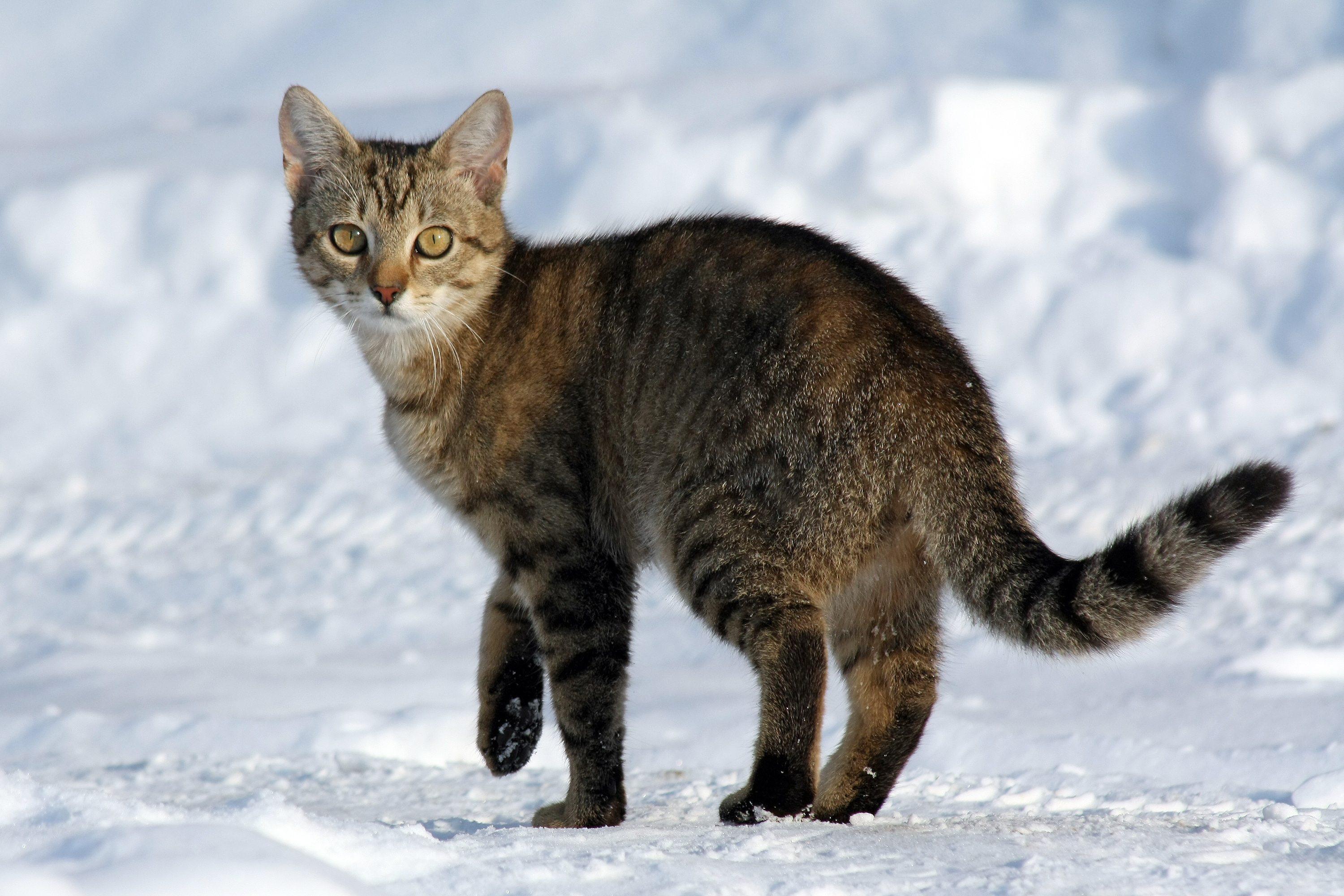
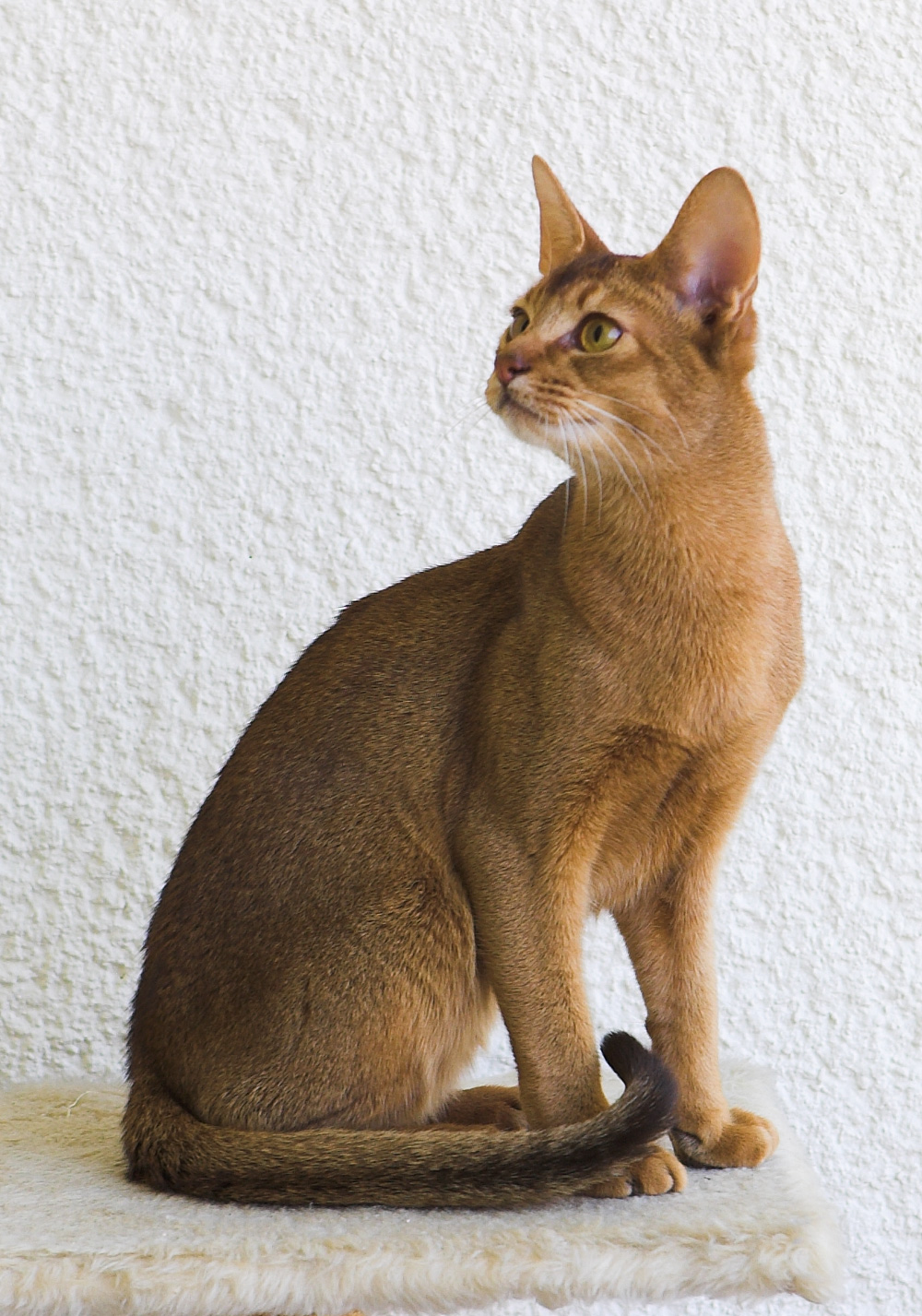
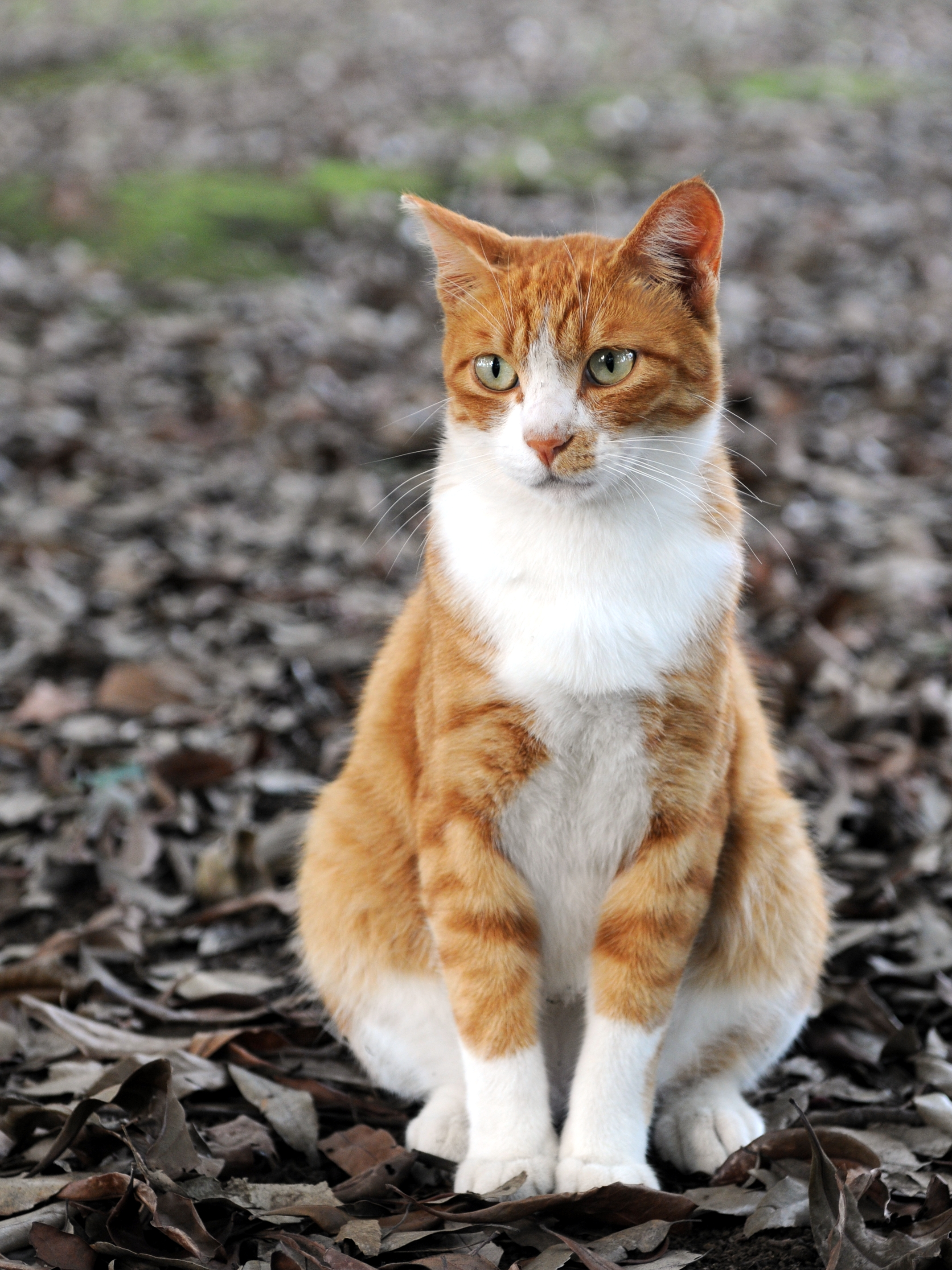
- Various types of cats

Conservation status
- Domesticated

Scientific classification
- Kingdom: Animalia
- Phylum: Chordata
- Class: Mammalia
- Order: Carnivora
- Family: Felidae
- Genus: Felis
- Species: F. catus

Binomial name
- Felis catus Linnaeus, 1758

Synonyms
- Catus domesticus Erxleben, 1777; F. angorensis Gmelin, 1788; F. vulgaris Fischer, 1829

= Cat =

Cat Temporal range: 0.0095–0 Ma Holocene to present (9,500 years ago)

Small domesticated carnivorous mammal

The cat (Felis catus), also called domestic cat and house cat, is a small domesticated carnivorous mammal. It is a member of Felidae, the family of mammals in the order Carnivora also colloquially referred to as cats. An obligate carnivore requiring a predominantly meat-based diet, it has retractable claws adapted to killing small prey species such as mice and rats. It has a strong, flexible body, quick reflexes, and sharp teeth, and its night vision and sense of smell are well developed. It is a social species, but a solitary hunter and a crepuscular predator. Cat communication includes meowing, purring, trilling, hissing, growling, grunting, body language, and scent marking. It can hear sounds too faint or too high in frequency for human ears, such as those made by small mammals. It secretes and perceives pheromones. Cat intelligence is evident in its ability to adapt, learn through observation, and solve problems. The domestic cat is the only domesticated species of the family Felidae.

Advances in archaeology and genetics have shown that the domestication of the cat started in the Near East around 7500 BCE. Today, the domestic cat occurs across the globe and is valued by humans for companionship and its ability to kill vermin. It is commonly kept as a pet, working cat, and pedigreed cat shown at cat fancy events. Out of the estimated 600 million domestic cats worldwide, 400 million reside in Asia, including 58 million in China. About 73.8 million cats are estimated to live in the United States, and about 10.9 million cats in the United Kingdom. Felis catus also ranges freely as a feral cat, avoiding human contact. Pet abandonment contributes to increasing of the global feral cat population, which has driven the decline of bird, mammal, and reptile species. Population control includes spaying and neutering.

== Etymology and naming ==
The origin of the English word cat, Old English catt, is thought to be the Late Latin word cattus, which was first used at the beginning of the 6th century. The Late Latin word may be derived from an unidentified African language. The Nubian word kaddîska 'wildcat' and Nobiin kadīs are possible sources or cognates.

The forms might also have derived from an ancient Germanic word that was absorbed into Latin and then into Greek, Syriac, and Arabic. The word may be derived from Germanic and Northern European languages, and ultimately be borrowed from Uralic, cf. Northern Sámi gáđfi 'female stoat', and Hungarian hölgy 'lady, female stoat'; from Proto-Uralic *käďwä 'female (of a furred animal)'.

The English puss, extended as pussy and pussycat, is attested from the 16th century and may have been introduced from Dutch poes or from Low German puuskatte, related to Swedish kattepus, or Norwegian pus, pusekatt. Similar forms exist in Lithuanian puižė and Irish puisín or puiscín. The etymology is unknown, but it may be an onomatopoeia from using a sound to attract a cat.

A male cat is called a tom, tommy, or tomcat (or a gib, if neutered). A female is called a queen (or sometimes a molly, if spayed). Some sources write that queen refers solely to unspayed cats that are in an estrous cycle. A juvenile cat is referred to as a kitten (also shortened to kitty), a term interchangeable with the now-obsolete word catling in Early Modern English. A group of cats can be referred to as a clowder, a glaring, or a colony.

== Taxonomy ==
The scientific name Felis catus was proposed by Carl Linnaeus in 1758 for a domestic cat. Felis catus domesticus was proposed by Johann Christian Polycarp Erxleben in 1777. Felis daemon proposed by Konstantin Satunin in 1904 was a black cat from the Transcaucasus, later identified as a domestic cat.

In 2003, the International Commission on Zoological Nomenclature conserved the name silvestris Erxleben 1777 for the wildcat, but did not suppress catus Linnaeus 1758. In 2007, the modern domesticated subspecies F. silvestris catus was sampled worldwide and considered to have probably descended from the African wildcat (F. lybica), following results of phylogenetic research. (Note: Driscoll, Macdonald & O'Brien 2009 did not conclude a date for genetic divergence, noting from archaeological evidence that "the broadest range of dates for domestication to be from 11,000 to 4,000 B.P.".) In 2017, the IUCN Cat Classification Taskforce, following the recommendation of Gentry et al. (2004) that names based on domestic forms be used for domestic derivatives of wild species, regarded the domestic cat as a distinct species, Felis catus.

== Evolution ==
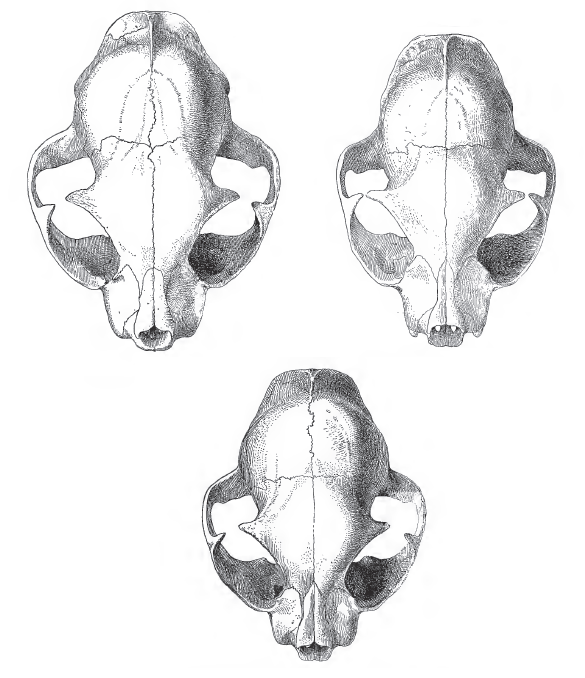
Skulls of a wildcat (top left), a housecat (top right), and a hybrid between the two (bottom center)

The domestic cat is a member of the Felidae, a family that has a common ancestor from about 10 to 15 million years ago. The evolutionary radiation of the Felidae began in Asia during the Miocene around 8.38 to 14.45 million years ago. Analysis of mitochondrial DNA of all Felidae species indicates a radiation at 6.46 to 16.76 million years ago. The genus Felis genetically diverged from other Felidae around 6 to 7 million years ago. Results of phylogenetic research shows that the wild members of this genus evolved through sympatric or parapatric speciation, whereas the domestic cat evolved through artificial selection.

The genome sequence of the domestic cat was first published in 2007 and is available at the National Center for Biotechnology Information. The domestic cat and its closest wild ancestor both possess 19 chromosome pairs and roughly 20,000 genes. The cat genome sequence has been used for various purposes, including the study of cat migration patterns and disease.

Phylogenetic relationships of the domestic cat as derived through analysis of

nuclear DNA:

- Felidae
  - Pantherinae
  - Felinae
    - other Felinae lineages
    - Felis
      - Jungle cat (F. chaus)
      - - Black-footed cat (F. nigripes)
        - - Sand cat (F. margarita)
          - - - Chinese mountain cat (F. bieti)
              - African wildcat (F. lybica)
            - - European wildcat (F. silvestris)
              - Domestic cat

mitochondrial DNA:

- Felis
  - Sand cat (F. margarita)
  - - Chinese mountain cat (F. bieti)
    - - European wildcat (F. silvestris)
      - - African wildcat
          - Southern African wildcat (F. l. cafra)
          - Asiatic wildcat (F. l. ornata)
          - - Near Eastern wildcat
            - Domestic cat

=== Domestication ===
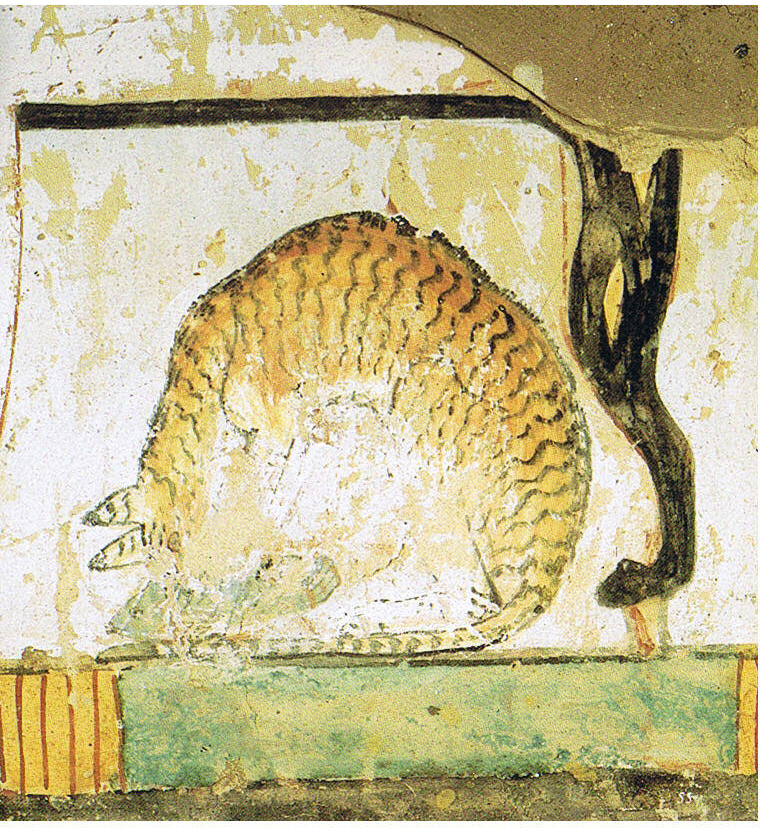
A cat eats a fish under a chair, in a mural in an Egyptian tomb dating to the 15th century BCE.

It was long thought that the domestication of the cat began in ancient Egypt, where cats were venerated from around 3100 BCE. However, the earliest known indication for the taming of an African wildcat (Felis lybica) was excavated close by a human Neolithic grave in Shillourokambos, southern Cyprus, dating to about 7500–7200 BCE. Since there is no evidence of native cat species on Cyprus, the inhabitants most likely brought African wildcats from the West Asian mainland. Scientists therefore assume that African wildcats were attracted to early human settlements in the Fertile Crescent by rodents, in particular the house mouse (Mus musculus), and were tamed by Neolithic farmers. This mutual relationship between early farmers and tamed cats lasted thousands of years. As agricultural practices spread, so did tame and domesticated cats. Wildcats of Egypt contributed to the maternal gene pool of the domestic cat at a later time.

The earliest known evidence for the occurrence of the domestic cat in Greece dates to around 1200 BCE. Greek, Phoenician, Carthaginian and Etruscan traders introduced it to southern Europe. By the 5th century BCE, it was a familiar animal around settlements in Magna Graecia and Etruria. During the Roman Empire, it was introduced to Corsica and Sardinia. By the end of the Western Roman Empire in the 5th century, the Egyptian domestic cat lineage had arrived in a Baltic Sea port in northern Germany.

During domestication, cats have undergone only minor changes in anatomy and behavior, and they are still capable of surviving in the wild. Several natural behaviors and characteristics of wildcats may have pre-adapted them for domestication as pets. These traits include their small size, social nature, obvious body language, love of play, and high intelligence. Their rigorous grooming habits and instinct to bury their bodily waste make them generally much less messy than other domesticated animals.

Domestic cats were spread throughout much of the rest of the world during the Age of Discovery, as ships' cats were carried on sailing ships to control shipboard rodents and as good-luck charms. The development of cat breeds started in the mid-19th century. An analysis of the domestic cat genome revealed that the ancestral wildcat genome was significantly altered in the process of domestication, as specific mutations were selected to develop cat breeds. Most breeds are founded on random-bred domestic cats; genetic diversity of these breeds varies between regions, and is lowest in purebred populations, which show more than 20 deleterious genetic disorders.

Hybridization between domestic and other Felinae species is also possible, producing hybrids such as the Kellas cat in Scotland. House cats can mate with feral cats.

The leopard cat (Prionailurus bengalensis) was tamed independently in China around 5500 BCE. This line of a partially domesticated cat left no trace in the domestic cat populations of today. Captive Leopardus cats also display affectionate behavior toward humans but are not domesticated.

== Characteristics ==
=== Size ===
Diagram of the general anatomy of a male domestic cat

The domestic cat has a smaller skull and shorter bones than the European wildcat. It averages about 46 cm (18 in) in head-to-body length and 23–25 cm (9.1–9.8 in) in height, with about 30 cm (12 in) long tails. Males are larger than females. Adult domestic cats typically weigh 4–5 kg (8.8–11.0 lb).

=== Skeleton ===
Cats have seven cervical vertebrae (as do most mammals); 13 thoracic vertebrae (humans have 12); seven lumbar vertebrae (humans have five); three sacral vertebrae (as do most mammals, but humans have five); and a variable number of caudal vertebrae in the tail (humans have only three to five vestigial caudal vertebrae, fused into an internal coccyx). The extra lumbar and thoracic vertebrae account for the cat's spinal mobility and flexibility. Attached to the spine are 13 ribs, the shoulder, and the pelvis. Unlike human arms, cat forelimbs are attached to the shoulder by free-floating clavicle bones which allow them to pass their body through any space into which they can fit their head.

=== Skull ===
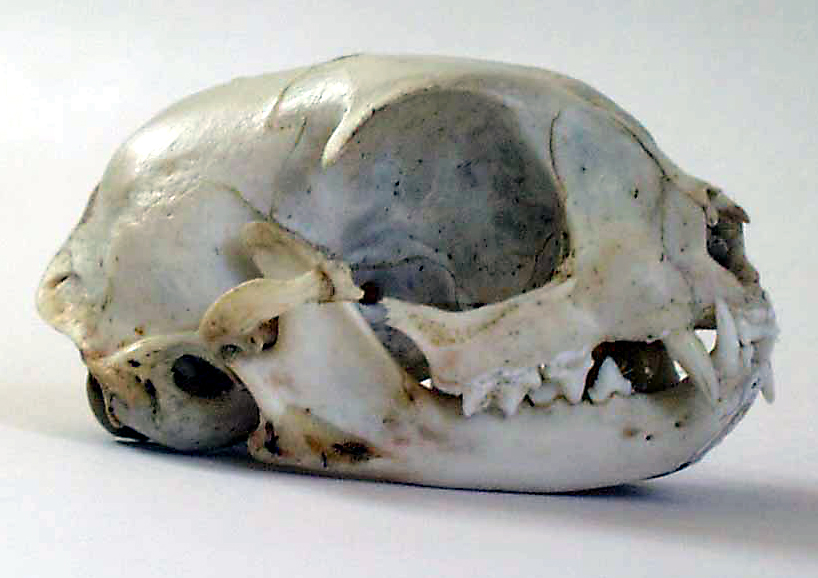
Cat skull

The cat skull is unusual among mammals in having very large eye sockets and a powerful specialized jaw. Two long canine teeth for killing and tearing prey can stab between two of the prey's vertebrae and sever its spinal cord, causing paralysis and death. Compared to other felines, domestic cats have narrowly spaced canine teeth relative to the size of their jaw, which is an adaptation to their preferred prey of small rodents, which have small vertebrae.

The premolar and first molar together compose the carnassial pair on each side of the mouth, which efficiently shears meat into small pieces, like a pair of scissors. These are vital in feeding, because cats' small molars cannot chew food effectively, and cats are largely incapable of mastication. Cats tend to have better dental health than most humans, with decay generally less likely because of a thicker protective layer of enamel, a less damaging saliva, less retention of food particles between teeth, and a diet mostly devoid of sugar. Nonetheless, they are subject to occasional tooth loss and infection.

=== Claws ===
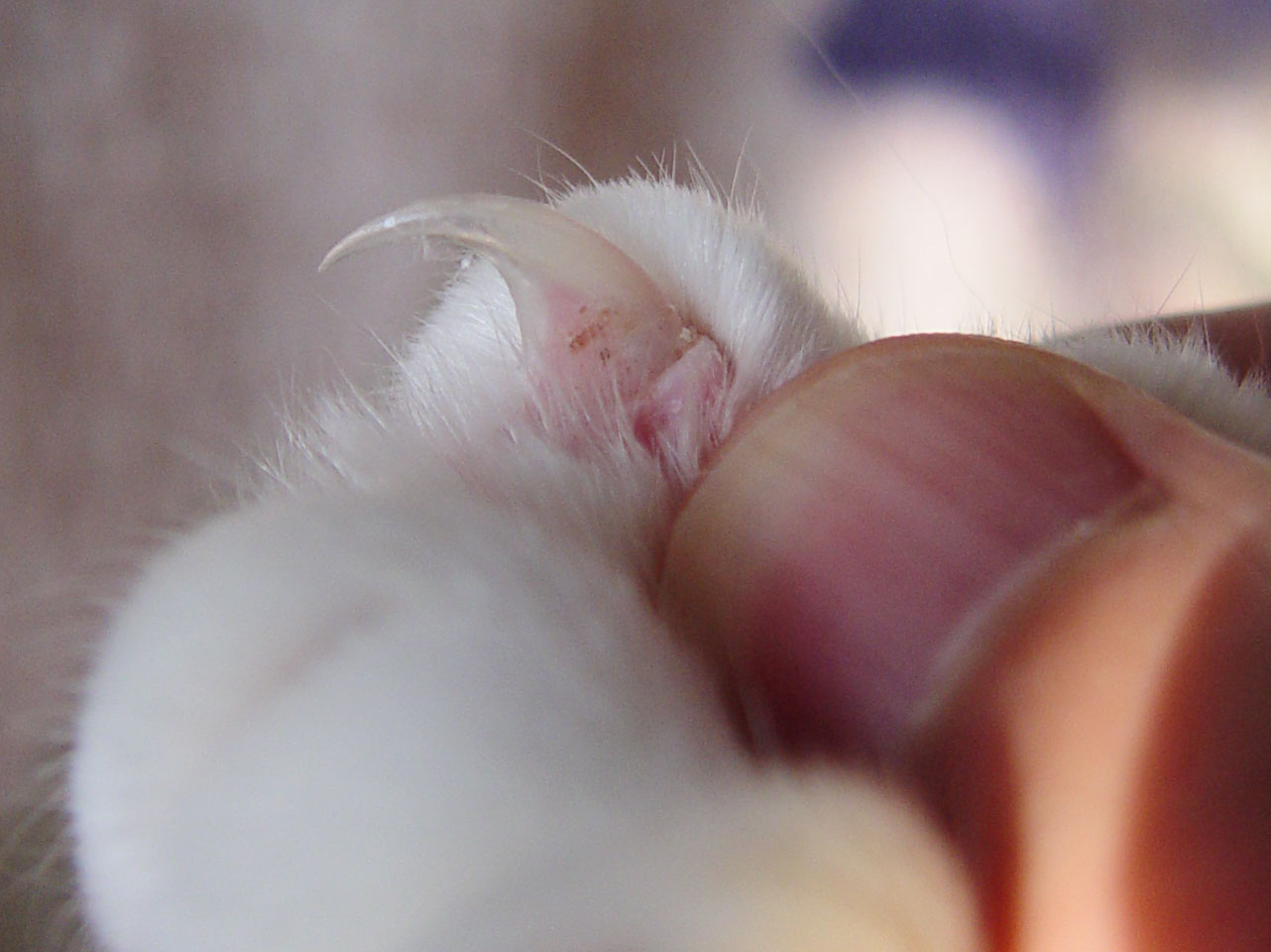
Cat's claw

Cats have protractible and retractable claws. In their normal, relaxed position, the claws are sheathed with the skin and fur around the paw's toe pads. This keeps the claws sharp by preventing wear from contact with the ground and allows for the silent stalking of prey. The claws on the forefeet are typically sharper than those on the hindfeet. Cats can voluntarily extend their claws, such as in hunting, fighting, climbing, kneading, or for extra traction on soft surfaces. Cats shed the outside layer of their claw sheaths when scratching rough surfaces.

Most cats have five claws on their front paws and four on their rear paws. The dewclaw is proximal to the other claws. More proximally is a protrusion which appears to be a sixth "finger". This special feature of the front paws on the inside of the wrists has no function in normal walking but is thought to be an antiskidding device used while jumping. Some cat breeds are prone to having extra digits ("polydactyly").

=== Ambulation ===
The cat is digitigrade. It walks on the toes, with the bones of the feet making up the lower part of the visible leg. Unlike most mammals, it uses a "pacing" gait that alternates both legs together on each side. It registers directly by placing each hind paw close to the track of the corresponding fore paw, minimizing noise and visible tracks. This also provides sure footing for hind paws when navigating rough terrain. As it speeds up from walking to trotting, its gait changes to a "diagonal" gait: The diagonally opposite hind and fore legs move simultaneously.

=== Balance ===
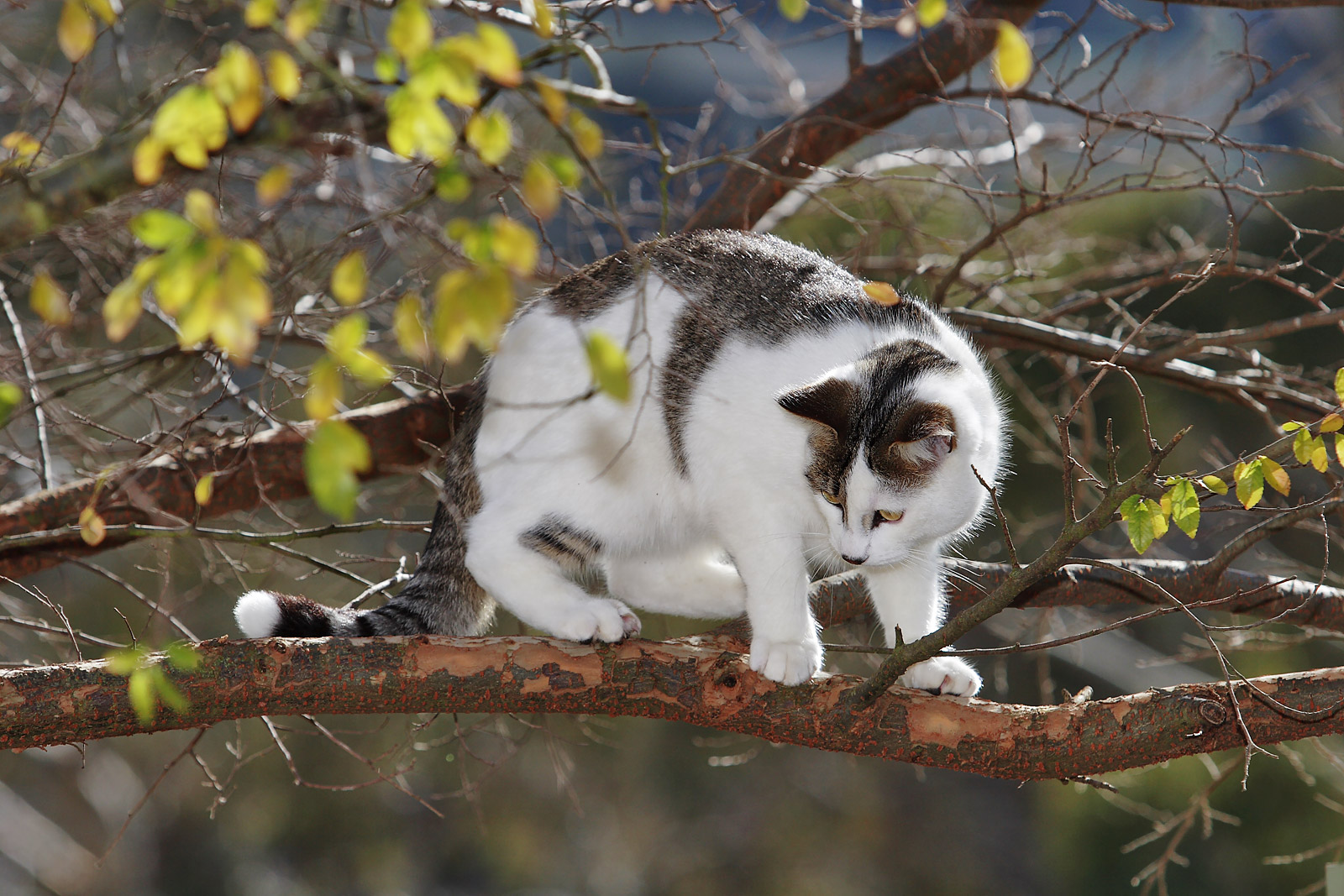
A cat is perched on a tree branch, having climbed up for exploration, escape, or hunting.

Cats are generally fond of perching in high places. This may be a concealed hunting site such as a tree branch, for domestic cats to pounce upon prey. They favor a superior observation point over territory. A cat falling from up to 3 m (9.8 ft) can right itself and land on its paws.

During a lofty fall, a cat reflexively twists and rights itself to land on its feet using its acute sense of balance and flexibility. This reflex is known as the cat righting reflex. A cat always rights itself in the same way, and it has enough time in falls of at least 90 cm (3.0 ft). This has been investigated as the "falling cat problem".

=== Coats ===
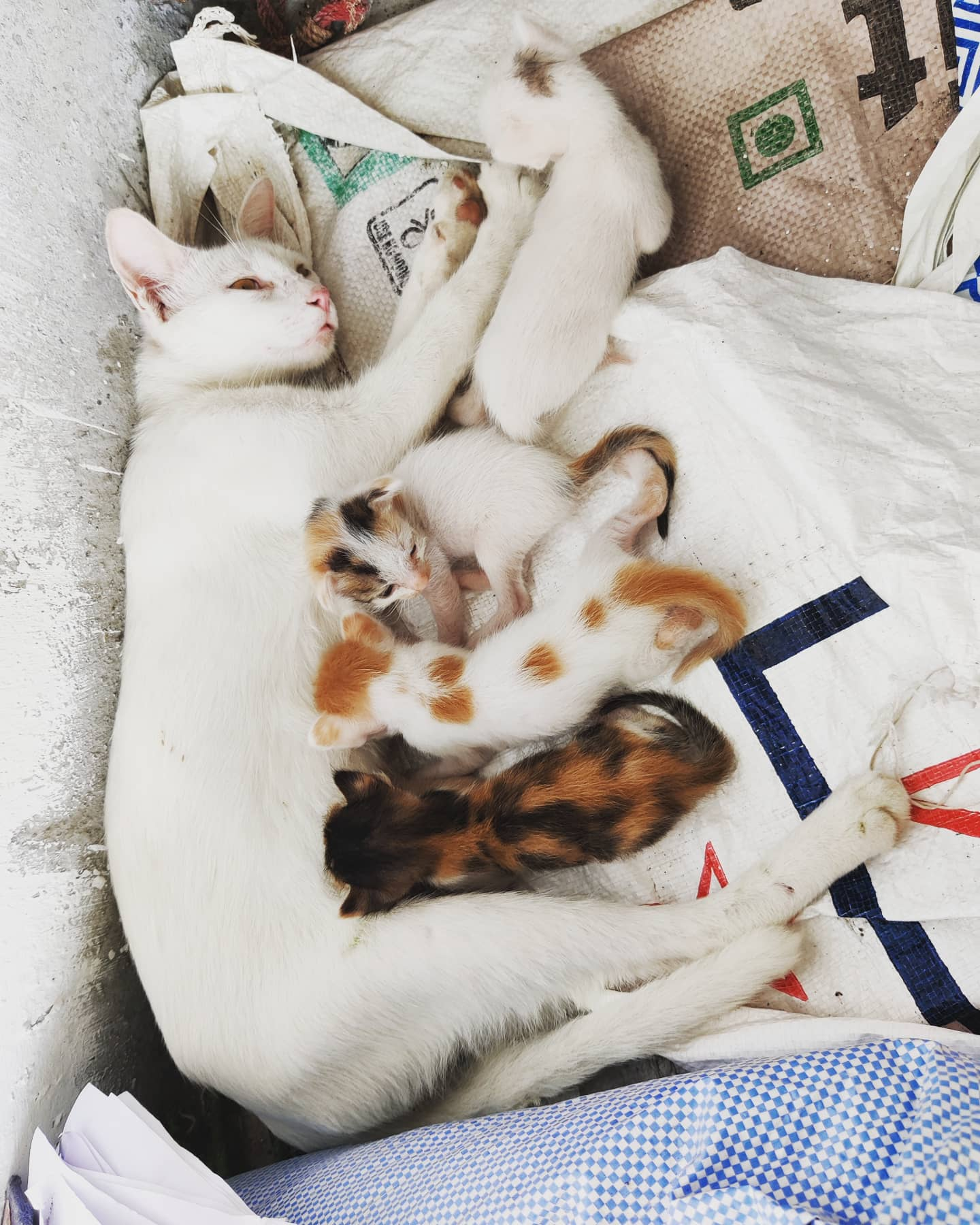
Mother cat with her different-colored offspring

The domestic cat genes MC1R and ASIP allow color variety in the coat. The feline ASIP gene consists of three coding exons. Three novel microsatellite markers linked to ASIP were isolated from a domestic cat BAC clone containing this gene to perform linkage analysis on 89 domestic cats segregated for melanism. The domestic cat family demonstrated a cosegregation between the ASIP allele and black coloration of the coat.

=== Diet ===
The cat is an obligate carnivore and has adapted to a low-fibre highly digestible meat diet. Cats have fewer enzymes capable of metabolising carbohydrates compared to omnivores. The cat lacks the ability to convert carotenoids to vitamin A; has an inability to synthesise enough vitamin D; inability to synthesise niacin from tryptophan; inability to synthesise cysteine, citrulline, and methionine; lacks glucokinase activity; and an intolerance to glutamic acid (which is low in animal tissue and high in plant matter). Taurine and arginine are essential for cats. Due to the inability to synthesise adequate amounts of citrulline a single meal lacking in arginine can be fatal to a cat. Cats cannot produce enough taurine and require dietary taurine; a lack of taurine will cause a cat to develop dilated cardiomyopathy. Commercial cat diets historically were lacking in taurine and dilated cardiomyopathy was a common issue until it was linked to taurine deficiency in a 1987 study.

== Senses ==
=== Vision ===
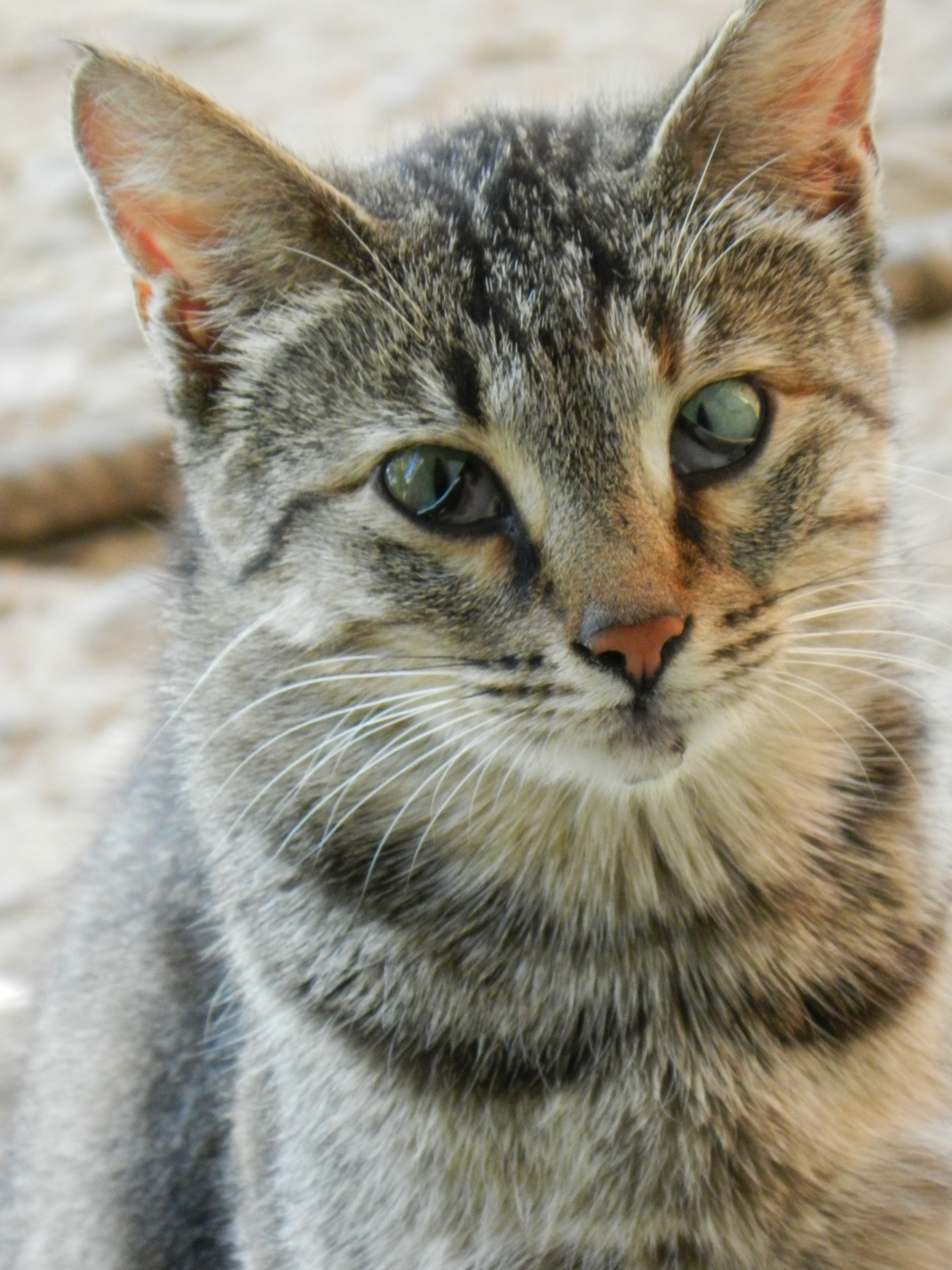
A cat's nictitating membrane is exposed as it blinks.

Cats have excellent night vision and can see at one sixth the light level required for human vision. This is partly the result of cat eyes having a tapetum lucidum, which reflects any light that passes through the retina back into the eye, thereby increasing the eye's sensitivity to dim light. Large pupils are an adaptation to dim light. The domestic cat has slit pupils, which allow it to focus bright light without chromatic aberration. At low light, a cat's pupils expand to cover most of the exposed surface of its eyes. The domestic cat has rather poor color vision and only two types of cone cells, optimized for sensitivity to blue and yellowish green; its ability to distinguish between red and green is limited. A response to middle wavelengths from a system other than the rod cells might be due to a third type of cone. This appears to be an adaptation to low light levels rather than representing true trichromatic vision. Cats have a nictitating membrane, allowing them to blink without hindering their vision.

=== Hearing ===
The domestic cat's hearing is most acute in the range of 500 Hz to 32 kHz. It can detect an extremely broad range of frequencies ranging from 55 Hz to 79 kHz, whereas humans can only detect frequencies between 20 Hz and 20 kHz. It can hear a range of 10.5 octaves, compared to about 9 octaves for humans and dogs. Its hearing sensitivity is enhanced by its large movable outer ears, the pinnae, which amplify sounds and help detect the location of a noise. It can detect ultrasound, including ultrasonic calls from rodent prey. Research has shown that cats have socio-spatial cognitive abilities to create mental maps of familiar people's locations based on hearing their voices.

=== Smell ===
Cats have an acute sense of smell, due in part to their well-developed olfactory bulb and a large surface of olfactory mucosa, about 5.8 cm^{2} (0.90 in^{2}) in area, which is about twice that of humans. Cats and many other animals have a Jacobson's organ in their mouths that is used in the behavioral process of flehmening. It allows them to sense certain aromas in a way that humans cannot. Cats are sensitive to pheromones such as 3-mercapto-3-methylbutan-1-ol, which they use to communicate through urine spraying and marking with scent glands. Many cats also respond strongly to plants that contain nepetalactone, especially catnip, which they can detect at less than one part per billion. About 70–80% of cats are affected by nepetalactone. This response is also produced by other plants, such as silver vine (Actinidia polygama) and the herb valerian; it may be caused by the smell of these plants mimicking a pheromone and stimulating cats' social or sexual behaviors.

=== Taste ===
Cats have about 470 taste buds, compared to more than 9,000 on the human tongue. Domestic and wild cats share a taste receptor gene mutation that keeps their sweet taste buds from binding to sugary molecules, leaving them with no ability to taste sweetness. But they do have taste bud receptors specialized for acids, amino acids such as the constituents of protein, and bitter tastes.

Cats' taste buds possess the receptors needed to detect umami. However, these receptors contain molecular changes that make them taste umami differently from humans. In humans, they detect the amino acids glutamic acid and aspartic acid; but in cats, they instead detect inosine monophosphate and histidine. These molecules are particularly enriched in tuna. Researchers argue why cats find tuna so palatable: "the specific combination of the high IMP and free histidine contents of tuna, which produces a strong umami taste synergy that is highly preferred by cats." One researcher said, "I think umami is as important for cats as sweet is for humans."

Cats distinctly prefer food temperature around 38 °C (100 °F), similar to a fresh kill. Some cats reject cold food, which would signal to the cat that the prey is long dead and therefore possibly toxic or decomposing.

=== Whiskers ===
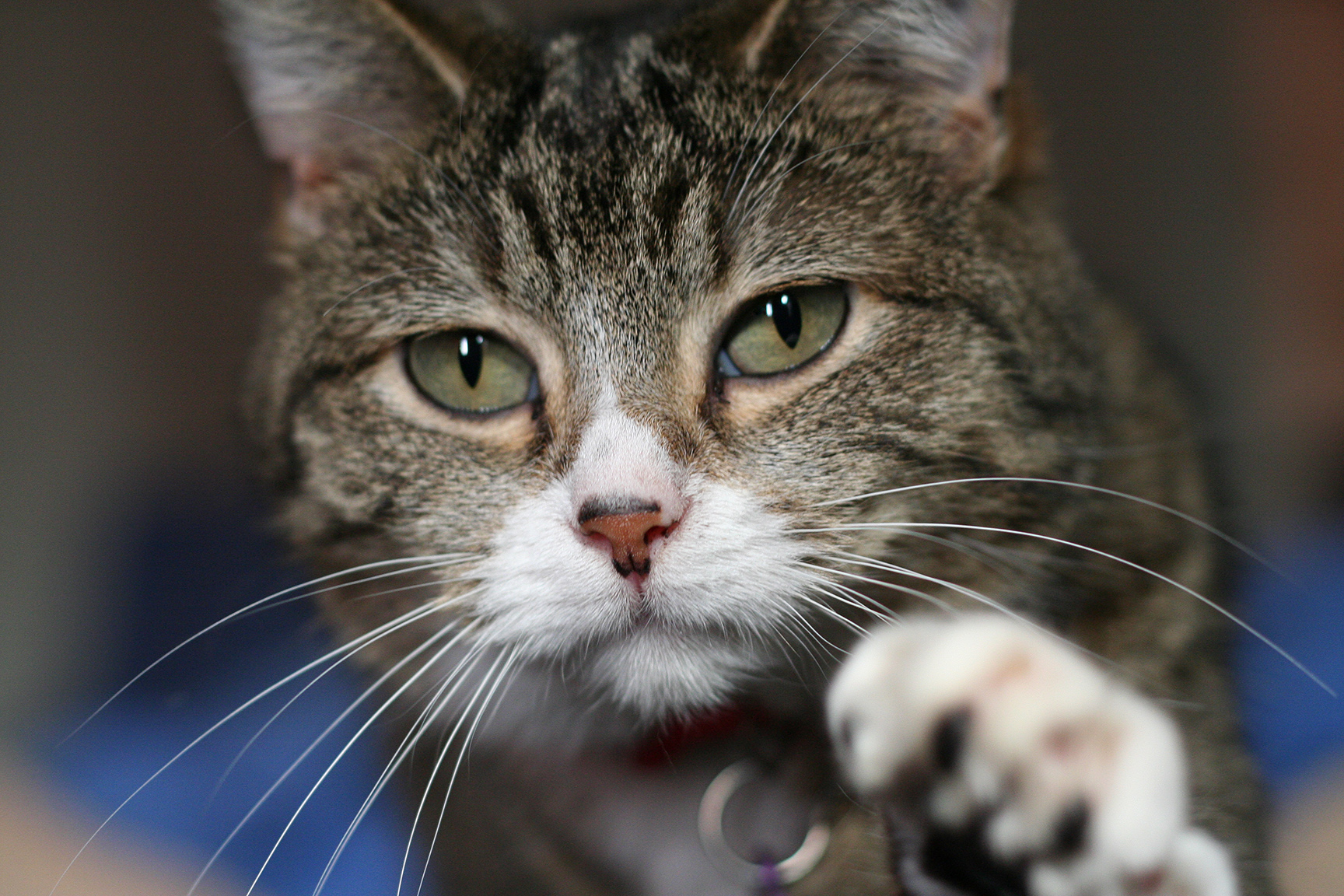
The whiskers of a cat are highly sensitive to touch.

To aid with navigation and sensation, cats have dozens of movable whiskers (vibrissae) over their body, most prominently on their faces, as seen by the long, white lines diverging outwards from its nose. These provide information on the width of gaps and on the location of objects in the dark, both by touching objects directly and by sensing air currents. They trigger protective blink reflexes to protect the eyes from damage.

== Behavior ==
Outdoor cats are active both day and night, although they tend to be slightly more active at night. Domestic cats spend the majority of their time in the vicinity of their homes, but they can range a radius of many hundreds of meters. They establish territories that vary considerably in size, in one study ranging 7–28 ha (17–69 acres). The timing of cats' activity is quite flexible and varied; but being low-light predators, they are generally crepuscular, which means they tend to be more active near dawn and dusk. However, house cats' behavior is also influenced by human activity, and they may adapt to their owners' sleeping patterns to some extent.

Cats conserve energy by sleeping more than most animals, especially as they grow older. The daily duration of sleep varies, usually between 12 and 16 hours, with 13 to 14 being the average. Some cats can sleep as much as 20 hours. The term "cat nap" for a short rest refers to the cat's tendency to fall asleep (lightly) for a brief period. Short periods of rapid eye movement sleep are often accompanied by muscle twitches, which suggests they are dreaming.

Behavioral and personality traits depend on a complex interplay between genetic and environmental factors. Scientific evidence does not support the popular belief that those traits are linked to coat colors.

=== Sociability ===
The social behavior of the domestic cat ranges from widely dispersed individuals to feral cat colonies that gather around a food source, based on groups of co-operating females. Within such groups, one cat is usually dominant over the others. Each cat in a colony holds a distinct territory, with sexually active males having the largest territories, which are about 10 times larger than those of female cats and may overlap with several females' territories. These territories are marked by urine spraying, rubbing objects at head height with secretions from facial glands, and by defecation. Between these territories are neutral areas where cats watch and greet one another without territorial conflicts. Outside these neutral areas, territory holders usually chase away stranger cats, at first by staring, hissing, and growling, and, if that does not work, by short and violent, noisy attacks. Because cats do not have a social survival strategy or herd behavior, they always hunt alone.

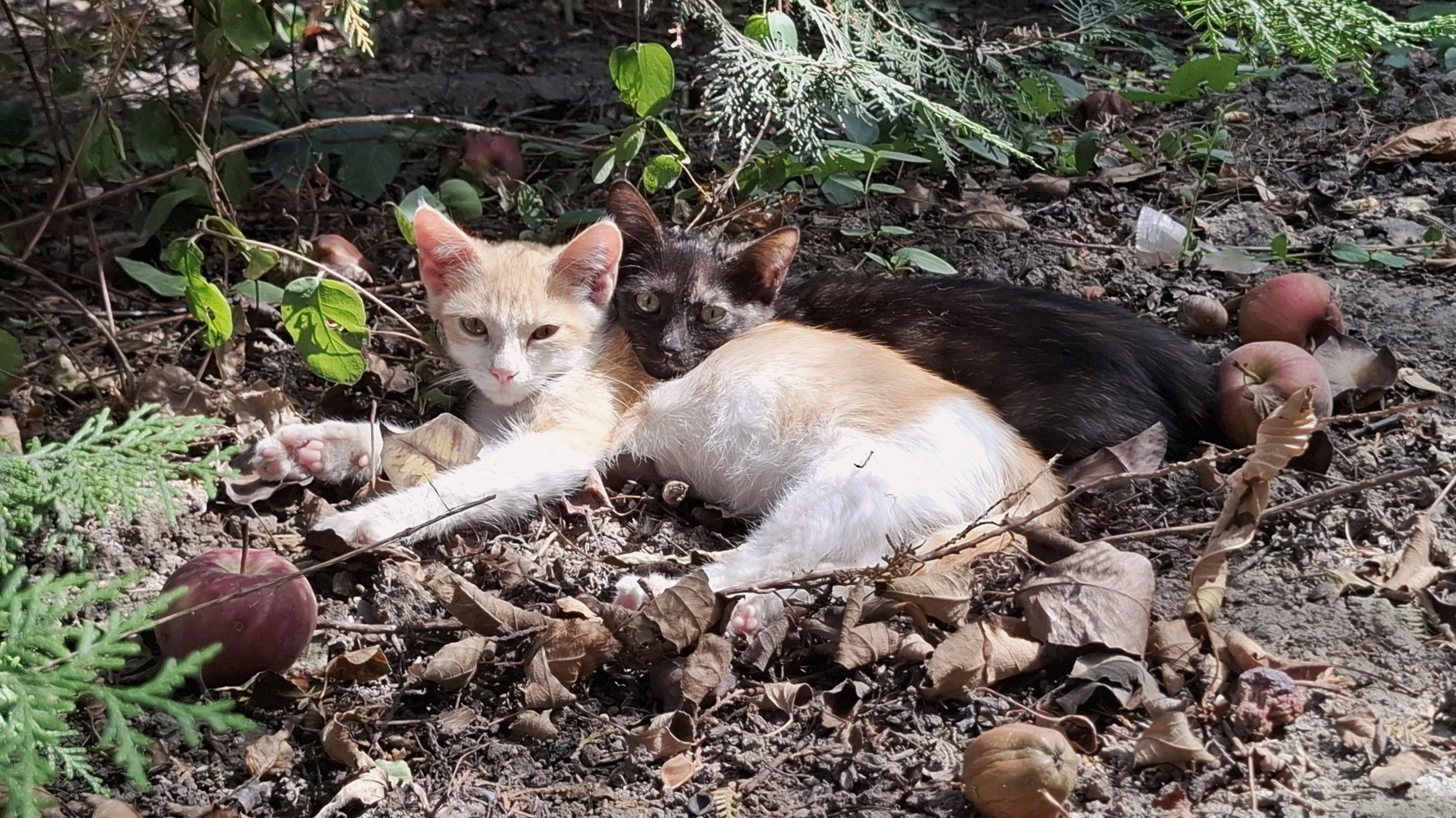
Two kittens lying side by side, an instinctive behavior that offers both comfort and protection

Life in proximity to humans and other domestic animals has led to a symbiotic social adaptation in cats, and cats may express great affection toward humans or other animals. Ethologically, a cat's human keeper functions as a mother surrogate. Adult cats live in a type of extended kittenhood, a form of behavioral neoteny. Their high-pitched sounds may mimic the cries of a hungry human infant, making them particularly difficult for humans to ignore. Some pet cats are poorly socialized. In particular, older cats may show aggressiveness toward newly arrived kittens, which includes biting and scratching; this type of behavior is known as feline asocial aggression.

Redirected aggression is a common form of aggression that can occur in multiple cat households. In redirected aggression, a cat is usually agitated by a stimulus such as a sight, sound, or other trigger that causes heightened anxiety or arousal; if the cat cannot attack the original stimulus, it may redirect its aggression toward the nearest cat, pet, human, or other being.

Domestic cats' scent rubbing behavior toward humans or other cats is thought to be a feline means of social bonding.

=== Communication ===
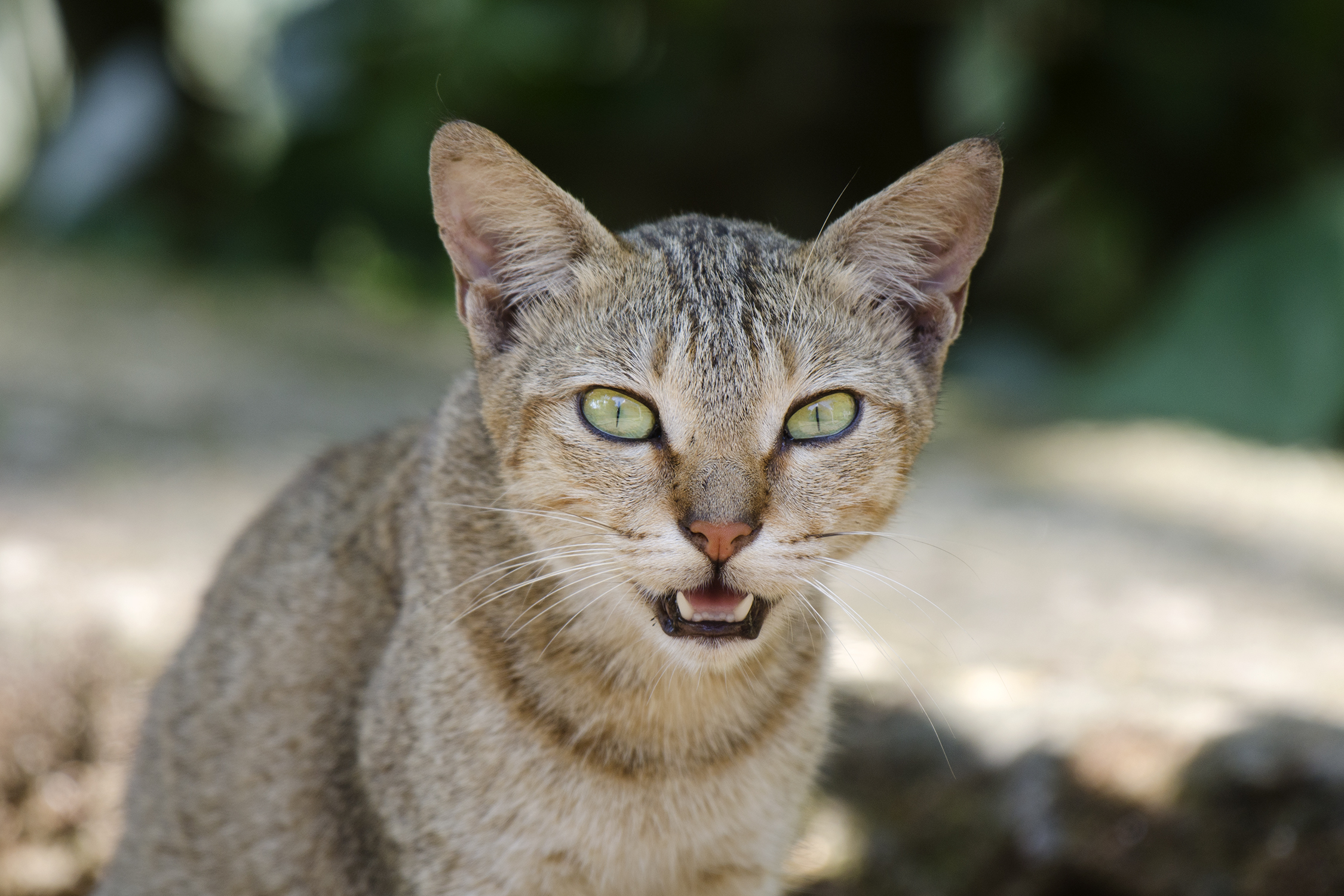
- Vocalizing domestic cat
- A meow

Domestic cats use many vocalizations for communication, including purring, trilling, hissing, growling/snarling, grunting, and several different forms of meowing. Their body language, including position of ears and tail, relaxation of the whole body, and kneading of the paws, are all indicators of mood. The tail and ears are particularly important social signal mechanisms; a raised tail indicates a friendly greeting, and flattened ears indicate hostility. Tail-raising also indicates the cat's position in the group's social hierarchy, with dominant individuals raising their tails less often than subordinate ones. Feral cats are generally silent. Nose-to-nose touching is also a common greeting and may be followed by social grooming, which is solicited by one of the cats raising and tilting its head.

Purring may have developed as an evolutionary advantage as a signaling mechanism of reassurance between mother cats and nursing kittens, who are thought to use it as a care-soliciting signal. Post-nursing cats also often purr as a sign of contentment: when being petted, becoming relaxed, or eating. Although purring is popularly interpreted as indicative of pleasure, it has been recorded in a wide variety of circumstances, most of which involve physical contact between the cat and another, presumably trusted individual. Some cats have been observed to purr continuously when chronically ill or in apparent pain.

The exact mechanism by which cats purr has long been elusive, but it has been proposed that purring is generated via a series of sudden build-ups and releases of pressure as the glottis is opened and closed, which causes the vocal folds to separate forcefully. The laryngeal muscles in control of the glottis are thought to be driven by a neural oscillator which generates a cycle of contraction and release every 30–40 milliseconds (giving a frequency of 33 to 25 Hz).

Domestic cats observed in rescue facilities have 276 morphologically distinct facial expressions based on 26 facial movements; each facial expression corresponds to different social functions that are probably influenced by domestication. Facial expressions have helped researchers detect pain in cats. The feline grimace scale's five criteria—ear position, orbital tightening, muzzle tension, whisker change, and head position—indicated the presence of acute pain in cats.

=== Grooming ===
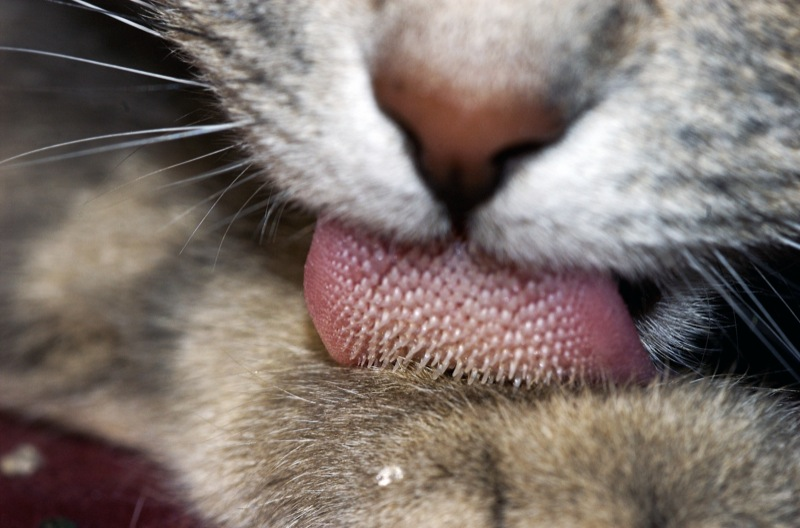
Cat tongue

Cats are known for spending considerable amounts of time licking their coats to keep them clean. The cat's tongue has backward-facing spines about 0.5 mm (0.020 in) long, called filiform papillae, which contain keratin making them rigid. The papillae act like a hairbrush, and some cats, particularly long-haired cats, occasionally regurgitate sausage-shaped 2–3 cm (0.8–1.2 in) long hairballs of fur that have collected in their stomachs from grooming. Hairballs can be prevented with remedies that ease elimination of the hair through the gut, and regular grooming of the coat with a comb or stiff brush.

=== Cat intelligence ===
A cat uses problem-solving skills to open a door.

Cat intelligence refers to a cat's ability to solve problems, adapt to its environment, learn new behaviors, and communicate its needs. Structurally, a cat's brain shares similarities with the human brain, containing around 250 million neurons in the cerebral cortex, which is responsible for complex processing. Cats display neuroplasticity allowing their brains to reorganize based on experiences. They have well-developed memory retaining information for a decade or longer. These memories are often intertwined with emotions, allowing cats to recall both positive and negative experiences associated with specific places. While they excel in observational learning and problem-solving, studies conclude that they struggle with understanding cause-and-effect relationships in the same way that humans do.

Cat intelligence study is mostly from consideration of the domesticated cat. Living in urban environments has exposed it to challenges that require adaptive behaviors, contributing to cognitive development. Selective breeding and genetic changes have further influenced its intelligence. Kittens learn essential survival skills by observing their mothers, while adult cats refine their abilities through trial and error.

=== Play ===
Kittens aged 14 weeks use fighting as a form of play.

Domestic cats, especially young kittens, are known for their love of play. This behavior mimics hunting and is important in helping kittens learn to stalk, capture, and kill prey. Cats also engage in play fighting, both with each other and with humans. This behavior may be a way for cats to practice the skills needed for real combat, and it might also reduce the fear that they associate with launching attacks on other animals.

Cats also tend to play with toys more when they are hungry. Owing to the close similarity between play and hunting, cats prefer to play with objects that resemble prey, such as small furry toys that move rapidly, but rapidly lose interest. They become habituated to a toy they have played with before. String is often used as a toy, but if it is eaten, it can become caught at the base of the cat's tongue and then move into the intestines, a medical emergency which can cause serious illness, even death.

=== Hunting and feeding ===
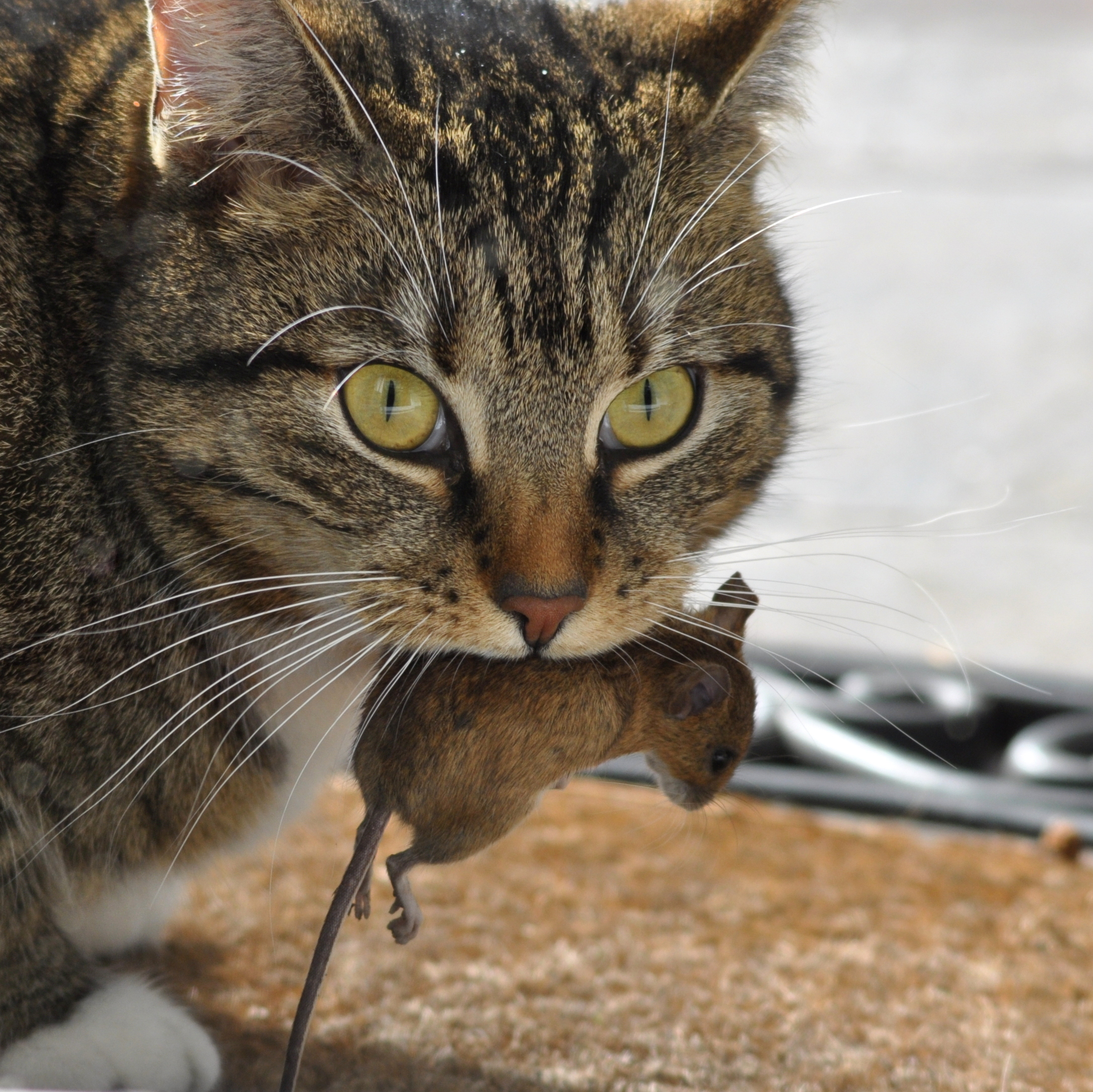
A deermouse is the prey of this domestic cat.

A domestic cat caught a peacock butterfly.

The shape and structure of cats' cheeks is insufficient to allow them to take in liquids using suction. Lapping at a rate of four times a second, the cat touches the smooth tip of its tongue to the surface of the water, and quickly retracts it like a corkscrew, drawing water upward into their mouths.

Feral cats and free-fed house cats consume several small meals in a day. The frequency and size of meals varies between individuals. They select food based on its temperature, smell, and texture; they dislike chilled foods and respond most strongly to moist foods rich in amino acids, which are similar to meat. Cats reject novel flavors (a response termed neophobia) and learn quickly to avoid foods that have tasted unpleasant in the past. It is also a common misconception that all cats like milk or cream, as they tend to avoid sweet food and milk. Most adult cats are lactose intolerant; the sugar in milk is not easily digested and may cause soft stools or diarrhea. Some also develop odd eating habits and like to eat or chew on things such as wool, plastic, cables, paper, string, aluminum foil, or even coal. This condition, pica, can threaten their health, depending on the amount and toxicity of the items eaten.

Cats hunt small prey, primarily birds and rodents, and are often used as a form of pest control. Other common small creatures, such as lizards, snakes and insects, may also become prey. Cats use two hunting strategies, either stalking prey actively, or waiting in ambush until a prey animal comes close enough to be captured. The strategy used depends on available prey, with cats waiting in ambush outside burrows, but tending to actively stalk birds. Domestic cats are a major predators of wildlife in the United States, killing an estimated 1.3 to 4.0 billion birds and 6.3 to 22.3 billion mammals annually.

Certain species appear more susceptible than others; in one English village, for example, 30% of house sparrow mortality was linked to the domestic cat. In the recovery of ringed robins (Erithacus rubecula) and dunnocks (Prunella modularis) in Britain, 31% of deaths were a result of cat predation. In parts of North America, the presence of larger carnivores such as coyotes, which prey on cats and other small predators, reduces the effect of predation by cats and other small predators such as opossums and raccoons on bird numbers and variety.

Another poorly understood element of cat hunting behavior is the presentation of prey to human guardians. One explanation is that cats adopt humans into their social group and share excess kill with others in the group according to the dominance hierarchy, in which humans are reacted to as if they are at or near the top. Another explanation is that they attempt to teach their guardians to hunt or to help their human as if feeding "an elderly cat, or an inept kitten". This hypothesis is inconsistent with the fact that male cats also bring home prey, though males have negligible involvement in raising kittens.

=== Fighting ===
A domestic cat exhibiting a threat display, hissing and arching its back.

Domestic males are more likely to fight than females. The most common reason for feral cat fighting is competition between two males to mate with a female, and most fights are won by the heavier male. Another common reason for fighting in domestic cats is the difficulty of establishing territories within a small home. Female cats also fight over territory or to defend their kittens. Neutering decreases or eliminates this behavior in many cases, suggesting that the behavior is linked to sex hormones.

When cats become aggressive, they try to appear larger and more threatening by raising their fur, arching their backs, turning sideways, hissing, or spitting. Often, the ears are pointed down and back to avoid damage to the inner ear and potentially listen for any changes behind them while focused forward. Cats may also vocalize loudly and bare their teeth in an effort to further intimidate their opponents. Fights usually consist of grappling, slapping the face and body with the forepaws, and bites. Cats throw themselves to the ground in a defensive posture to rake their opponent's belly with their hind legs.

Serious damage is rare, because the fights are usually short, with the loser fleeing with scratches to the face and ears. More severe fights for mating rights may give deep punctures and lacerations. Normally, serious injuries from fighting are limited to infections from scratches and bites. Bites are probably the main route of transmission of the feline immunodeficiency virus. Sexually active males are usually involved in many fights and have battered faces; to protect against facial injuries during fights, intact adult male cats often develop prominent cheeks due to the influence of testosterone as secondary sex characteristics, which also signal to females that the cat is a potential mate. Cats often threaten animals larger than them to defend their territory, such as dogs and foxes.

=== Reproduction ===
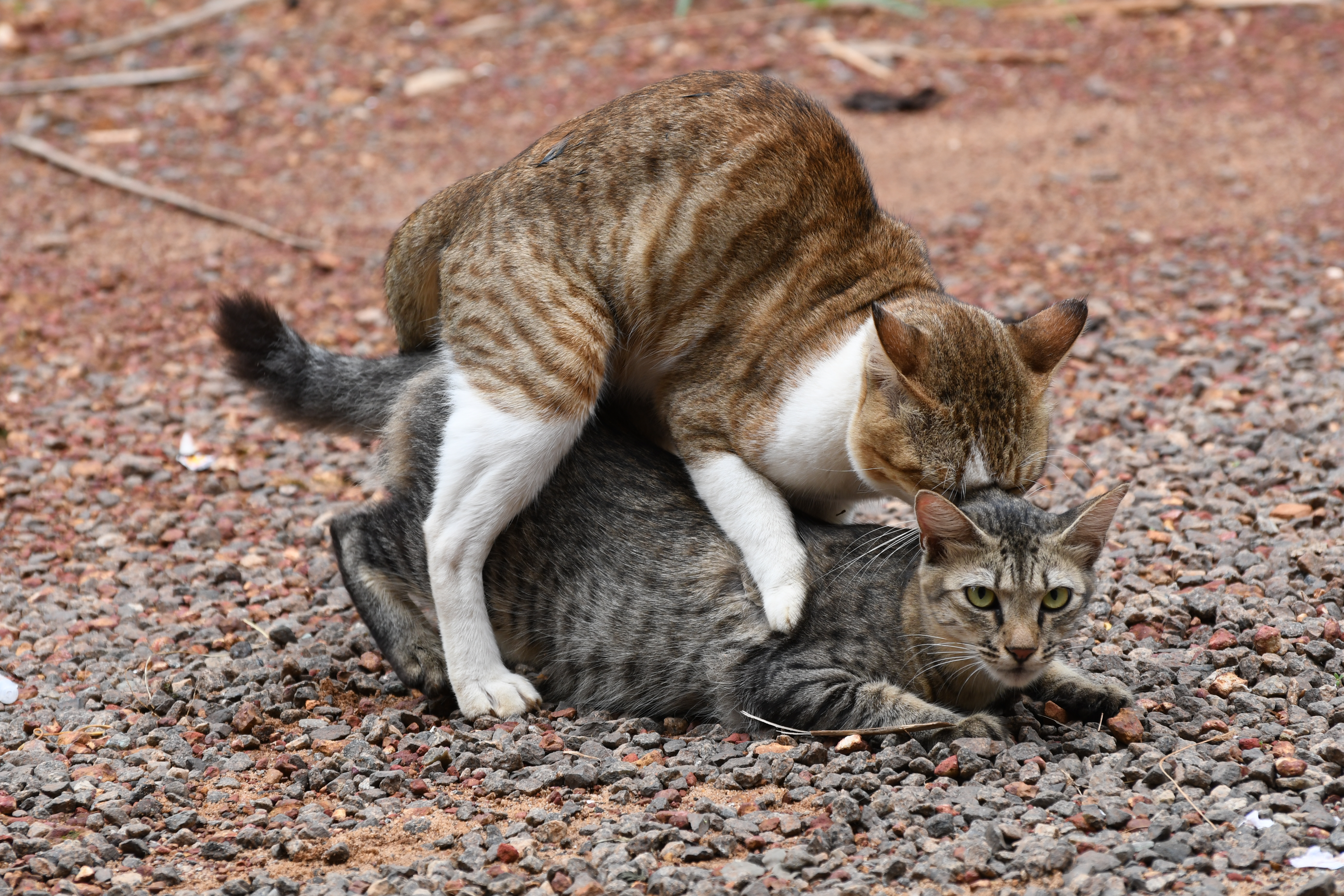
Domestic cats mating

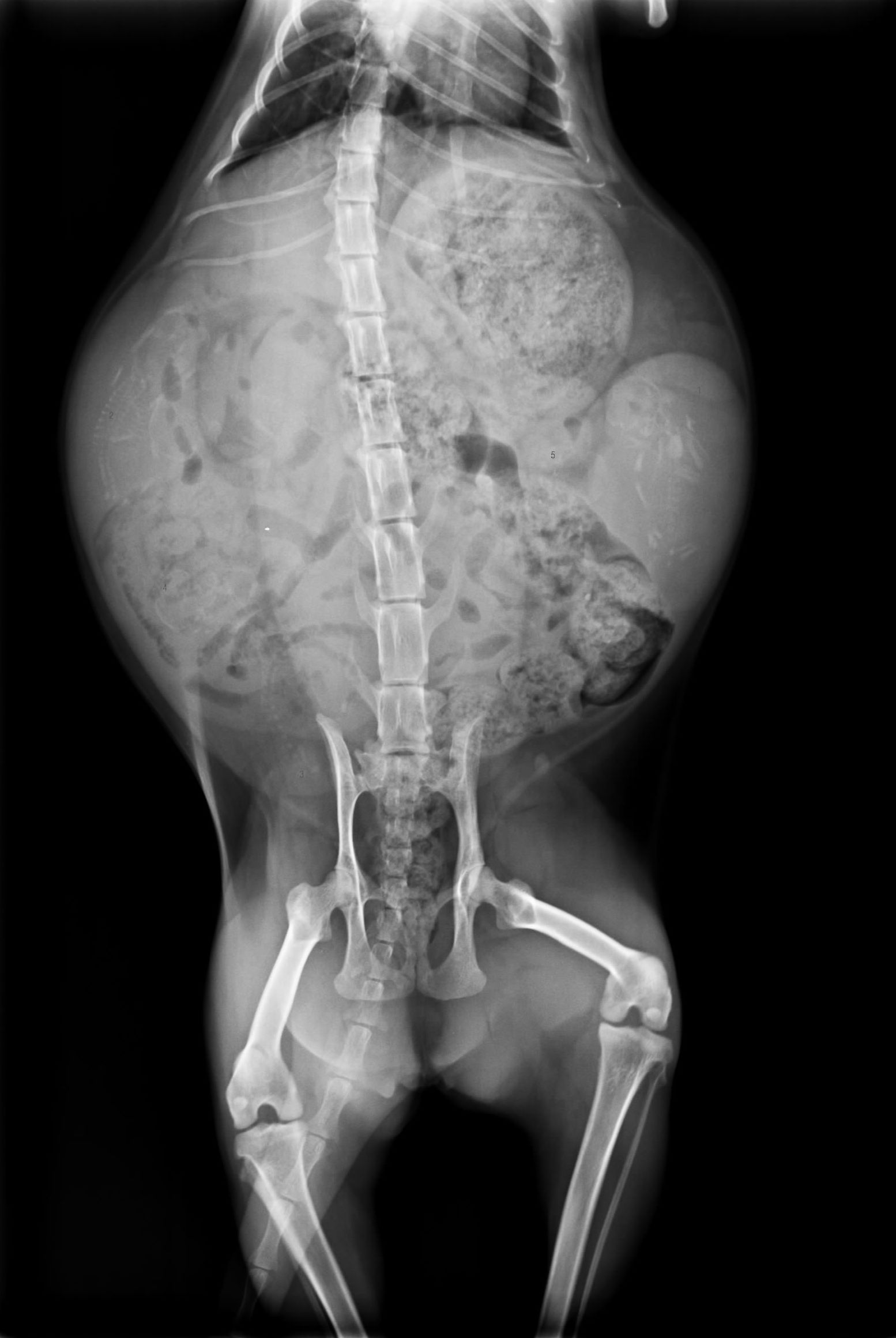
In this radiography of a pregnant cat, the skeletons of two fetuses are on the left and right of the uterus.

The cat secretes and perceives pheromones. Female cats, called queens, are polyestrous with several estrus cycles during a year, lasting usually 21 days. They are usually ready to mate between early February and August in northern temperate zones and throughout the year in equatorial regions.

Several males, called tomcats, are attracted to a female in heat. They fight over her, and the victor wins the right to mate. At first, the female rejects the male, but eventually, the female allows the male to mate. The female utters a loud yowl as the male pulls out of her because a male cat's penis has a band of about 120–150 backward-pointing penile spines, which are about 1 mm (0.039 in) long; upon withdrawal of the penis, the spines may provide the female with increased sexual stimulation, which acts to induce ovulation.

After mating, the female cleans her vulva thoroughly. If a male attempts to mate with her at this point, the female attacks him. After about 20 to 30 minutes, once the female is finished grooming, the cycle will repeat. Because ovulation is not always triggered by a single mating, females may not be impregnated by the first male with which they mate. Furthermore, cats are superfecund; that is, a female may mate with more than one male when she is in heat, with the result that different kittens in a litter may have different fathers.

The morula forms 124 hours after conception. At 148 hours, early blastocysts form. At 10–12 days, implantation occurs. The gestation of queens lasts between 64 and 67 days, with an average of 65 days.

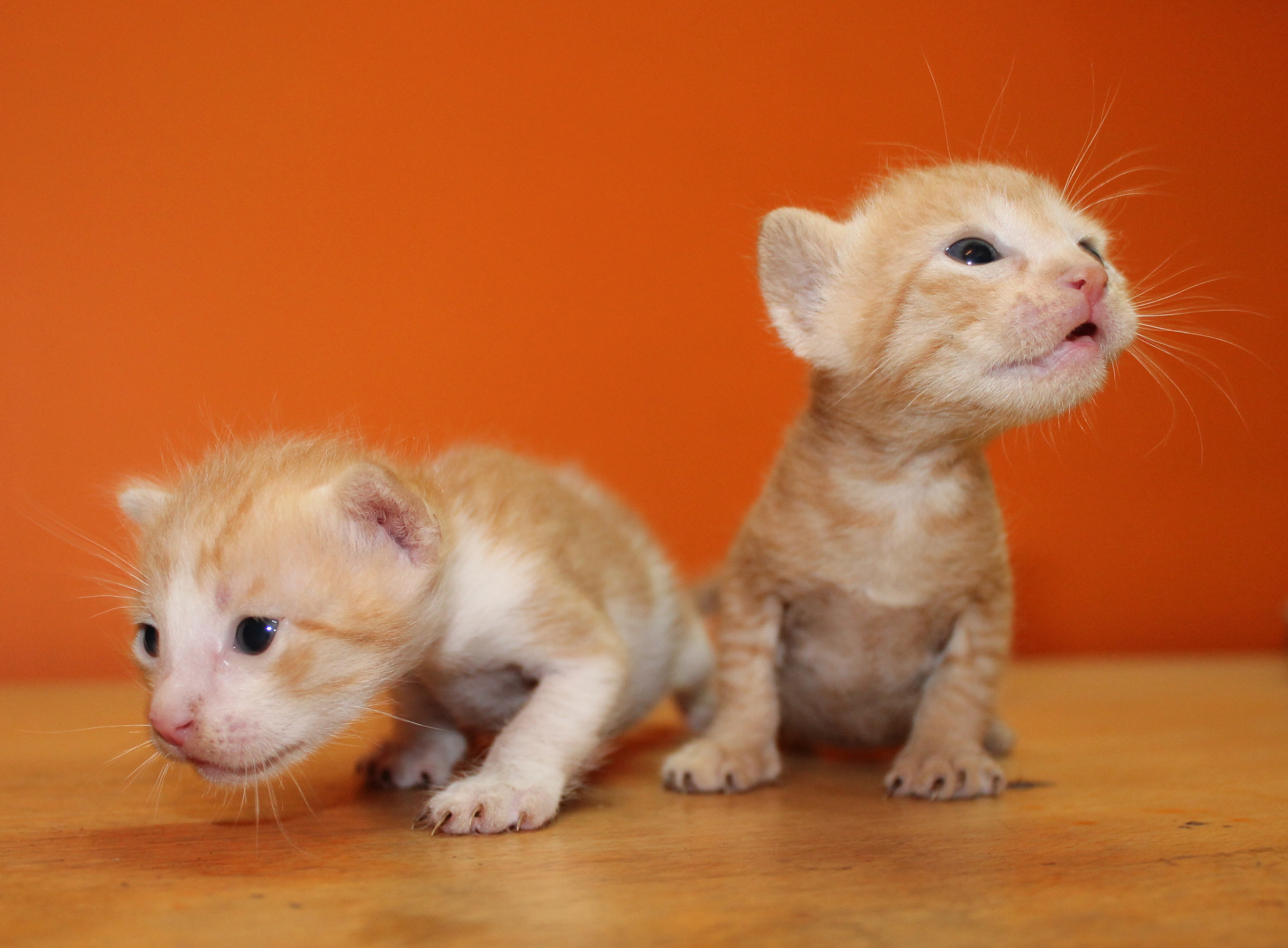
Two 17-day-old kittens

Based on a study of 2,300 free-ranging queens conducted from May 1998 and October 2000, they had one to six kittens per litter, with an average of three kittens. They produced a mean of 1.4 litters per year, but a maximum of three litters in a year. Of 169 kittens, 127 died before they were six months old due to a trauma caused in most cases by dog attacks and road accidents. The first litter is usually smaller than subsequent litters. Kittens are weaned between six and seven weeks of age. Queens normally reach sexual maturity at 5–10 months, and males at 5–7 months. This varies depending on breed. Kittens reach puberty at the age of 9–10 months.

Cats are ready to go to new homes at about 12 weeks of age, when they are ready to leave their mother. They can be surgically sterilized (spayed or castrated) as early as seven weeks to limit unwanted reproduction. This surgery also prevents undesirable sex-related behavior, such as aggression, territory marking (spraying urine) in males, and yowling (calling) in females. Traditionally, this surgery was performed at around six to nine months of age, but it is increasingly being performed before puberty, at about three to six months. In the United States, about 80% of household cats are neutered.

== Lifespan and health ==
The average lifespan of pet cats has risen in recent decades. In the early 1980s, it was about 7 years, rising to 9.4 years in 1995 and an average of about 13 years as of 2014 and 2023.

Neutering increases life expectancy; one 2024 study found neutered cats to live one year longer than entire cats. Having a cat neutered confers some health benefits, such as a decreased incidence of reproductive neoplasia. However, neutering decreases metabolism and increases food intake, both of which can cause obesity in neutered cats. Pre-pubertal neutering (neutering at 4 months or earlier) was only recommended by 28% of American veterinarians in one study. Some concerns of early neutering were metabolic, retarded physeal closure, and urinary tract disease related.

=== Disease ===
About 250 heritable genetic disorders have been identified in cats; many are similar to human inborn errors of metabolism. The high level of similarity among the metabolism of mammals allows many of these feline diseases to be diagnosed using genetic tests that were originally developed for use in humans, as well as the use of cats as animal models in the study of the human diseases. Diseases affecting domestic cats include acute infections, parasitic infestations, injuries, and chronic diseases such as kidney disease, hyperthyroidism, and arthritis. Vaccinations are available for many infectious diseases, as are treatments to eliminate parasites such as worms, ticks, and fleas.

== Health issues ==
A 15-year-old cat with remnants of squamous cell carcinoma on its nose

Between 50% and 90% of cats experience dental or gum problems, but these can be prevented by maintaining the cat's oral hygiene using products specifically designed for cats, which are not toxic for them. Accidental poisoning in cats is common and can result from several sources: plants that are toxic to cats, medications not intended for cats, foods unsuitable for cats, and household substances such as pesticides and household cleaners. Plants toxic to cats include lilies, tulips, and philodendrons; medication poisoning occurs when cats ingest drugs intended for human, such as acetaminophen and aspirin, as well as vitamin capsules, flea treatments designed for dogs, and foods dangerous to cats like grapes, onions, garlic, and chocolate.

Cat owners' attitudes and knowledge affects how they care for their cats, and people with greater knowledge about cats are less likely to use positive punishment, i.e. causing an unpleasant stimulus to the cat. Several organizations have published guidelines for the proper and safe care of cats. The American Society for the Prevention of Cruelty to Animals has published a general guide emphasizing proper cat care, which covers appropriate nutrition and needs for fresh and clean water, coat care, litter box maintenance, regular veterinary care. The American Association of Feline Practitioners and the International Society of Feline Medicine released a guide on environmental needs of cats. Professional organizations have emphasized the importance of environmental enrichment for cats, and some authors have raised concerns that many cat owners do not provide sufficient environmental enrichment. In an online survey of cat owners, only about half of the respondents reported playing with their cats daily.

Guidelines have also been published for veterinarians and caregivers to improve the welfare of cats under their care, including recommendations for cat-friendly interactions in veterinary clinics. The guide focuses on five main aspects: providing a safe private space for the cat to be alone; offering multiple environmental resources, such as resting areas and feeders, and separating food from water; opportunities for play and activities that simulate hunting behavior, via appropriate toys; positive, consistent, and predictable social interaction; and an environment that allows the cat to use its sense of smell normally (providing places where it can leave its scent, and avoiding strong odors).

== Ecology ==
=== Habitats ===
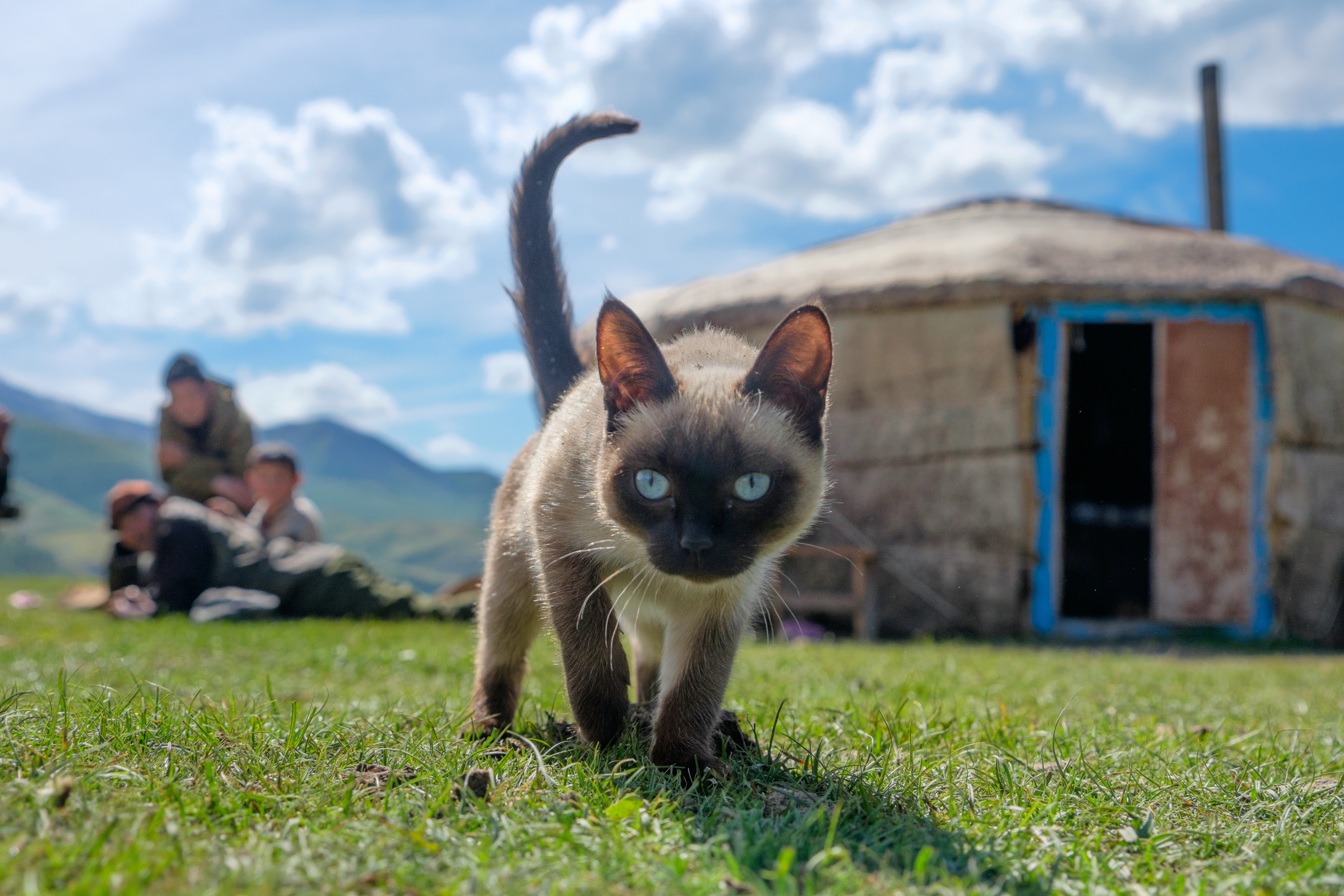
A colourpoint domestic shorthair cat living among the yurts of shepherds in the Altai Mountains, Russia

The domestic cat is a cosmopolitan species and occurs across much of the world. It is adaptable and now present on all continents except Antarctica, and on 118 of the 131 main groups of islands, even on the remote Kerguelen Islands. Due to its ability to thrive in almost any terrestrial habitat, it is among the world's most invasive species. It lives on small islands with no human inhabitants. Feral cats can live in forests, grasslands, tundra, coastal areas, agricultural land, scrublands, urban areas, and wetlands.

The unwantedness that leads to the domestic cat being treated as an invasive species is twofold. As it is little altered from the wildcat, it can readily interbreed with the wildcat. This hybridization poses a danger to the genetic distinctiveness of some wildcat populations, particularly in Scotland and Hungary, possibly also the Iberian Peninsula, and where protected natural areas are close to human-dominated landscapes, such as Kruger National Park in South Africa. However, its introduction to places where no native felines are present also contributes to the decline of native species.

=== Ferality ===
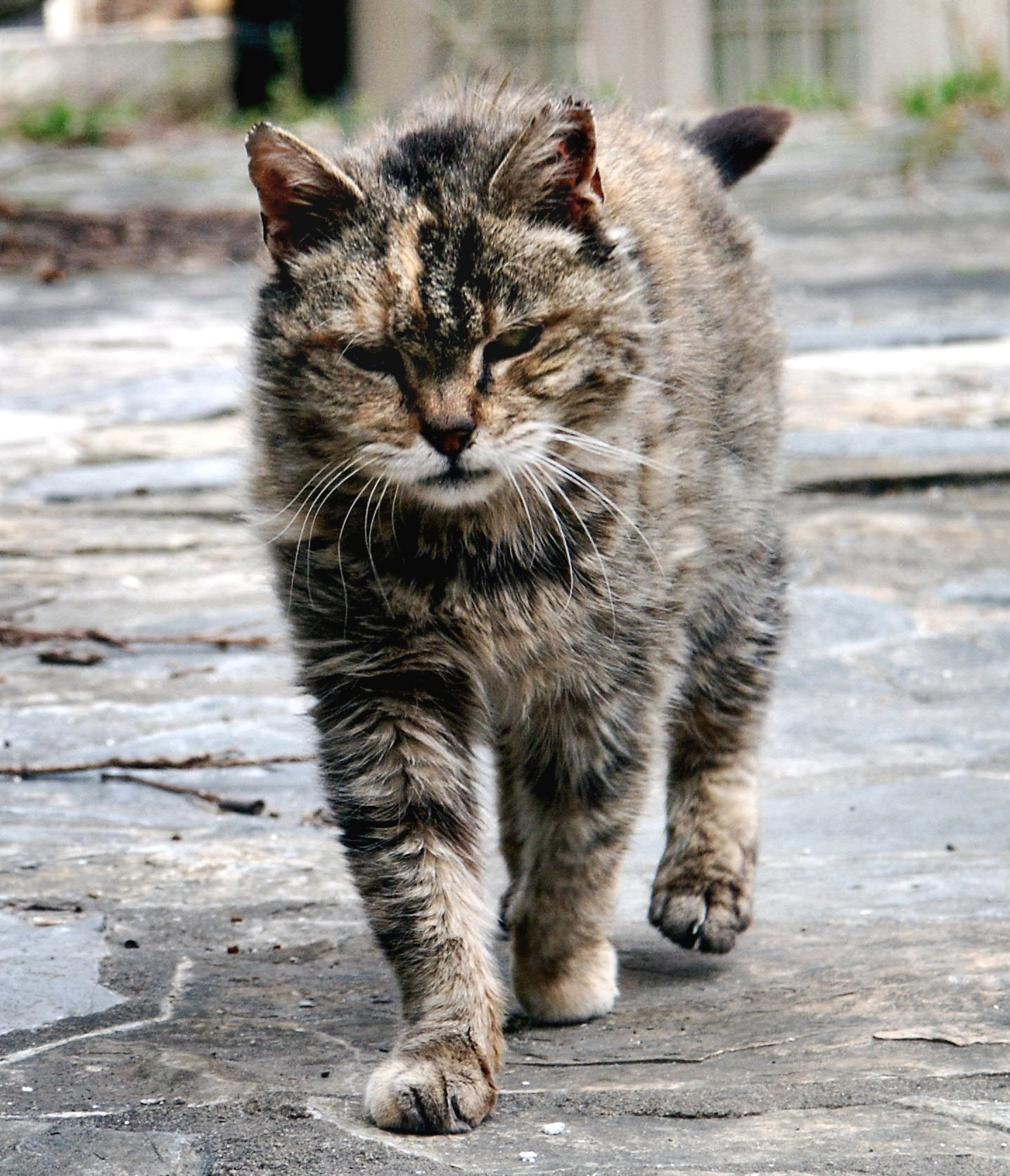
Feral farm cat

Feral cats are domestic cats that were born in or have reverted to a wild state. They are unfamiliar with and wary of humans and roam freely in urban and rural areas. The numbers of feral cats are not known, but estimates of the United States feral population range from 25 to 60 million. Feral cats may live alone, but most are in large colonies, which occupy a specific territory and are usually associated with a source of food. Famous feral cat colonies are in Rome around the Colosseum and Forum Romanum, some being fed and given medical attention by volunteers.

Public attitudes toward feral cats vary widely, from seeing them as free-ranging pets to regarding them as vermin.

=== Impact on wildlife ===
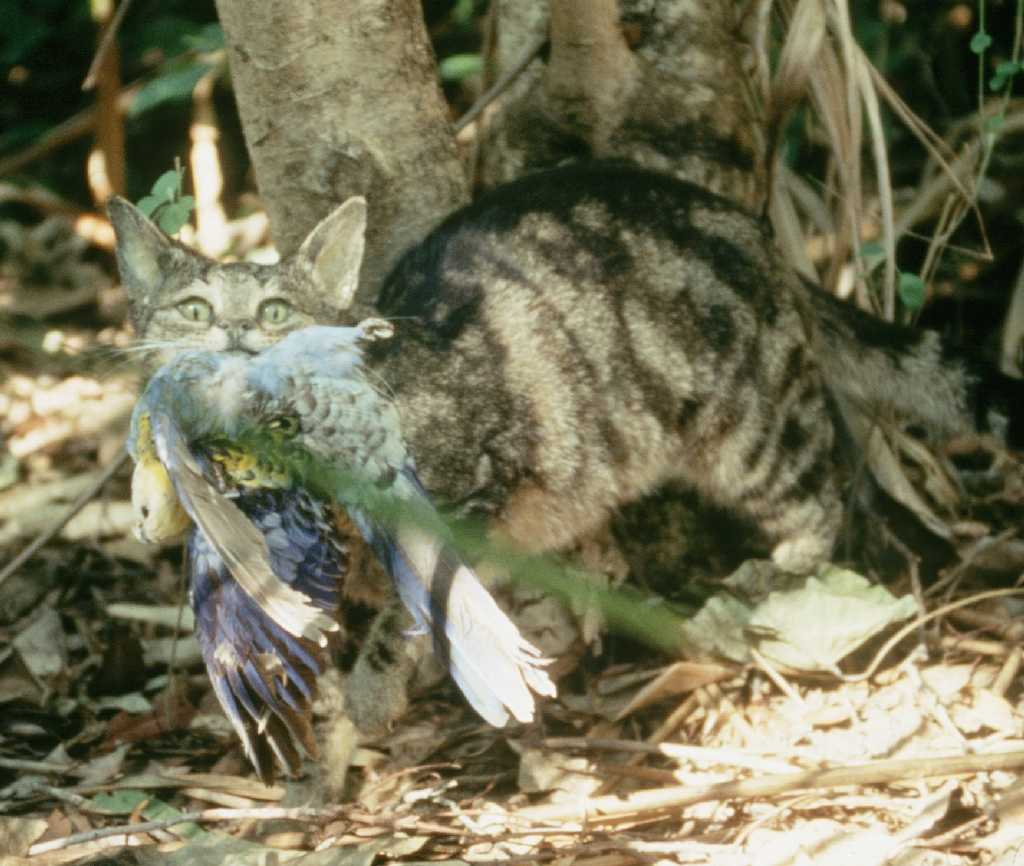
Cats kill billions of wild birds each year. This feral cat near Brisbane has caught a Pale-headed rosella.

Domestic cats are a contributing factor to the decline of several species, a factor that has ultimately led, in some cases, to extinction. The South Island piopio, Chatham rail, and the New Zealand merganser are a few from a long list, with the most extreme case being the flightless Lyall's wren, which was driven to extinction only a few years after its discovery. One feral cat in New Zealand killed 102 New Zealand lesser short-tailed bats in seven days. In the United States, feral and free-ranging domestic cats kill an estimated 6.3–22.3 billion mammals annually.

In Australia, one study found feral cats to kill 466 million reptiles per year. More than 258 reptile species were identified as being predated by cats. Cats have contributed to the extinction of the Navassa curly-tailed lizard and Chioninia coctei.

== Interaction with humans ==
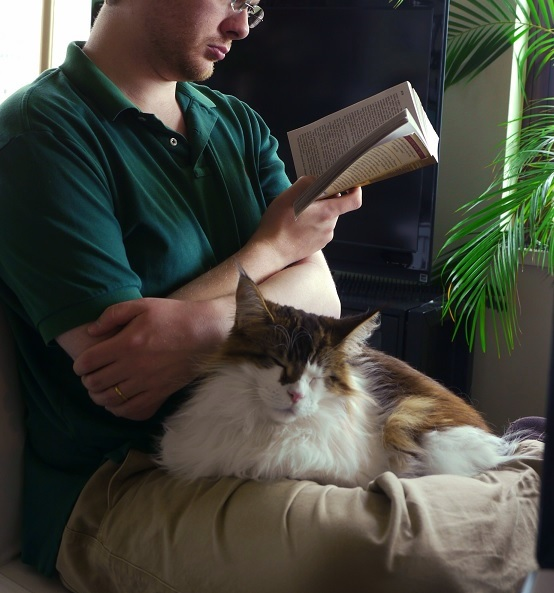
A cat lying on a man's lap

Cats are common pets throughout the world, and their worldwide population as of 2007 exceeded 500 million. As of 2024, the domestic cat was the second most popular pet in the United States, with 73.8 million cats owned and around 42.2 million households owning at least one cat. In the United Kingdom, 26% of adults have a cat, with an estimated population of 10.9 million pet cats as of 2020. As of 2021, there were an estimated 220 million owned and 480 million stray cats in the world.

Cats have been used for millennia to control rodents, notably around grain stores and aboard ships, and both uses extend to the present day. Cats are also used in the international fur trade and leather industries for making coats, hats, blankets, stuffed toys, shoes, gloves, and musical instruments. About 24 cats are needed to make a cat-fur coat. This use has been outlawed in the United States since 2000 and in the European Union (as well as the United Kingdom) since 2007.

Cat pelts have been used for superstitious purposes as part of the practice of witchcraft, and they are still made into blankets in Switzerland as traditional medicines thought to cure rheumatism.

A few attempts to build a cat census have been made over the years, both through associations or national and international organizations (such as that of the Canadian Federation of Humane Societies) and over the Internet. General estimates for the global population of domestic cats range widely from anywhere between 200 million to 600 million. Walter Chandoha made his career photographing cats after his 1949 images of Loco, a stray cat, were published. He is reported to have photographed 90,000 cats during his career and maintained an archive of 225,000 images that he drew from for publications during his lifetime.

Pet humanization is a form of anthropomorphism in which cats are kept for companionship and treated more like human family members than traditional pets. This trend of pet culture involves providing cats with a higher level of care, attention and often even luxury, similar to the way humans are treated.

=== Shows ===
A cat show is a judged event in which the owners of cats compete to win titles in various cat-registering organizations by entering their cats to be judged after a breed standard. It is often required that a cat must be healthy and vaccinated to participate in a cat show. Both pedigreed and non-purebred companion ("moggy") cats are admissible, although the rules differ depending on the organization. Competing cats are compared to the applicable breed standard, and assessed for temperament.

=== Infection ===
Cats can be infected or infested with viruses, pathogenic bacteria, fungus, protozoans, arthropods or worms that can transmit diseases to humans; infections of most concern include salmonella, cat-scratch disease, and toxoplasmosis. In some cases, the cat exhibits no symptoms of the disease. The same disease can then become evident in a human. The likelihood that a person will become diseased depends on the age and immune status of the person. Others might also acquire infections from cat feces and parasites exiting the cat's body.

== History and mythology ==
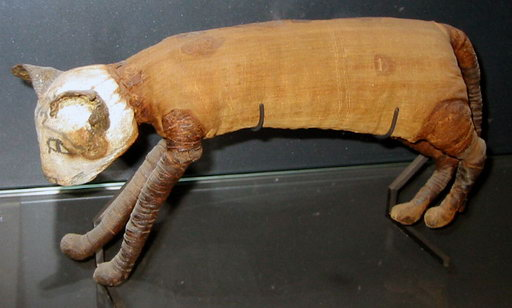
The ancient Egyptians mummified dead cats out of respect in the same way that they mummified people.

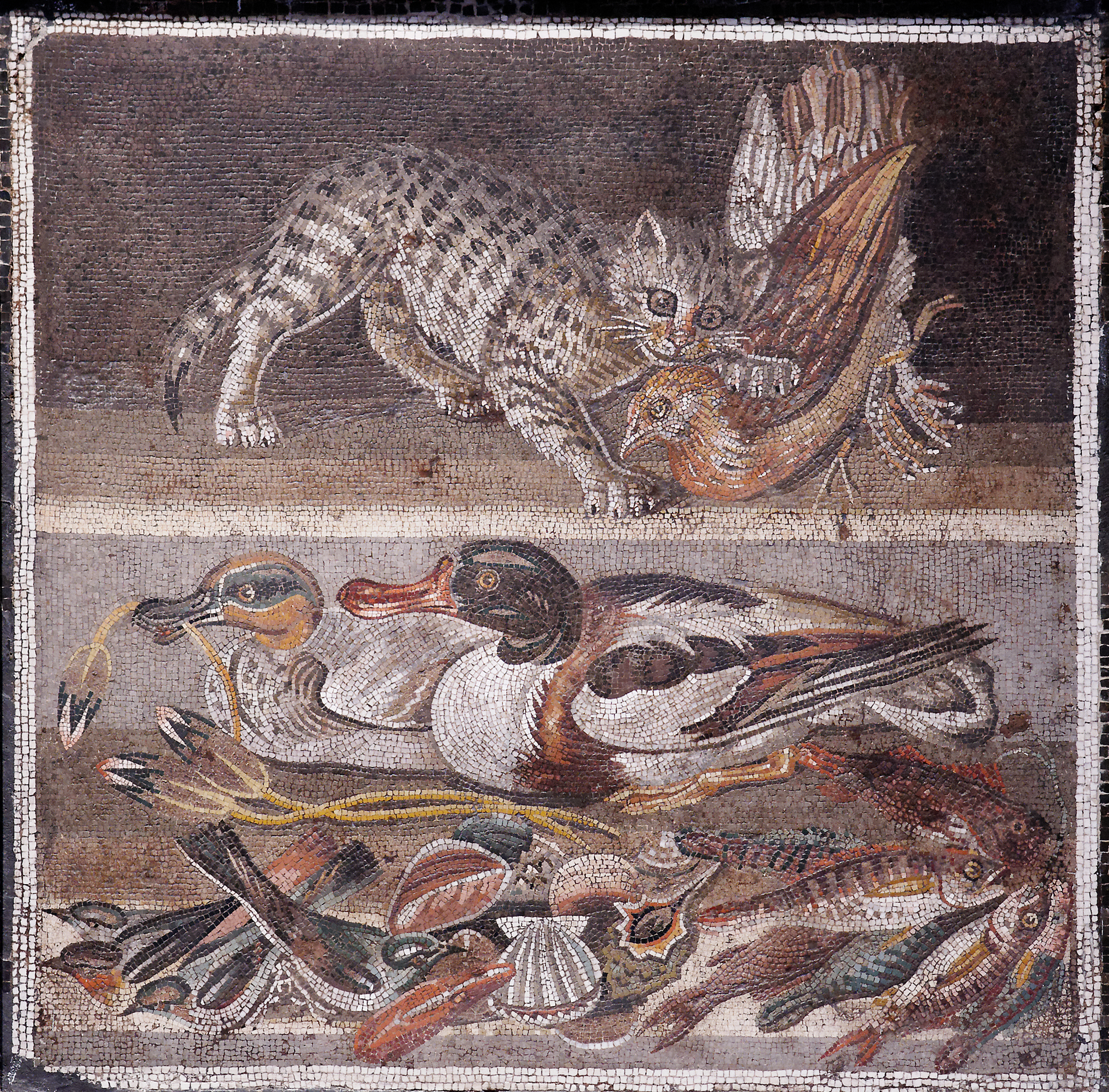
An ancient Roman mosaic depicts a cat killing a partridge from the House of the Faun in Pompeii.

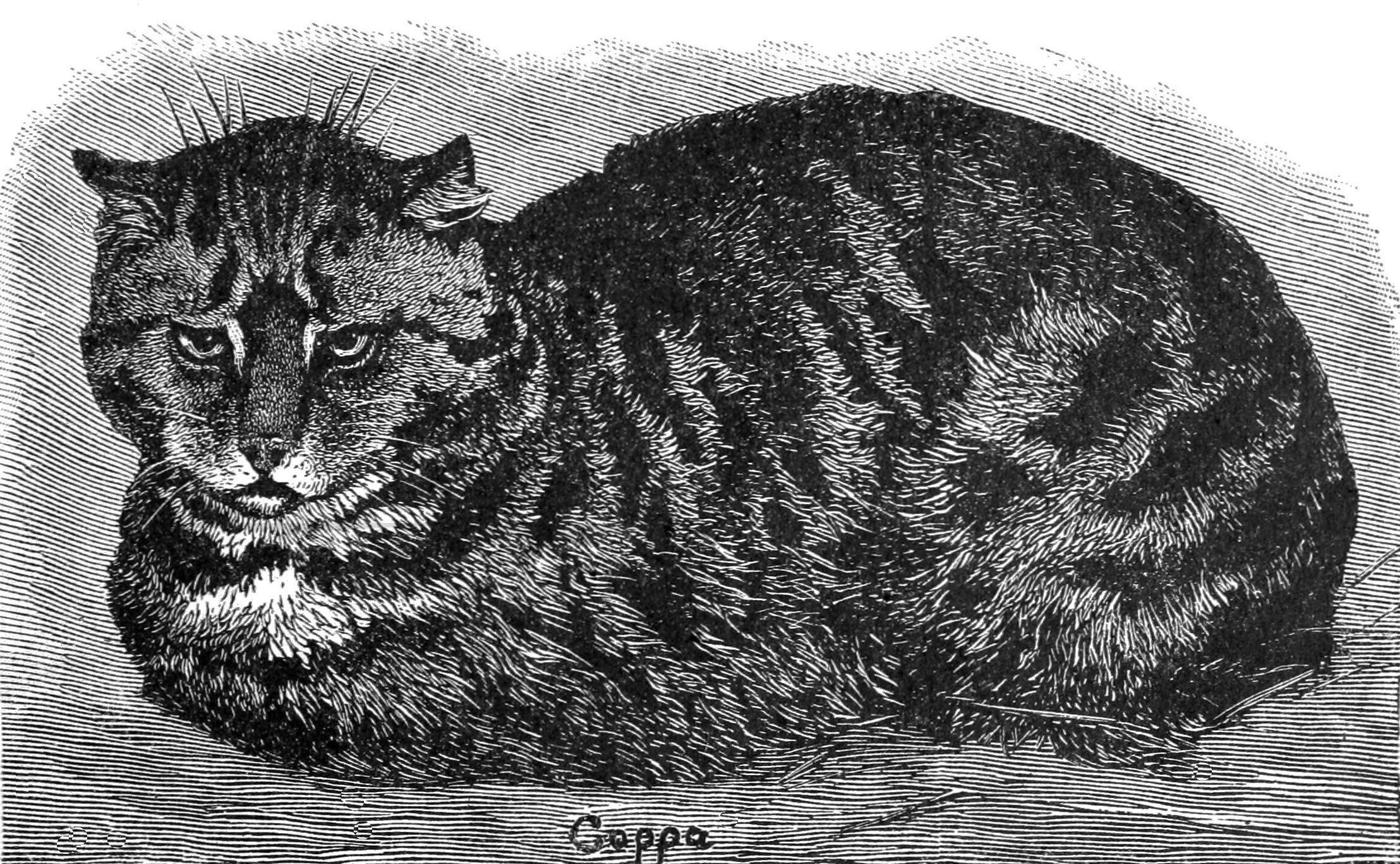
A 19th-century drawing of a tabby cat

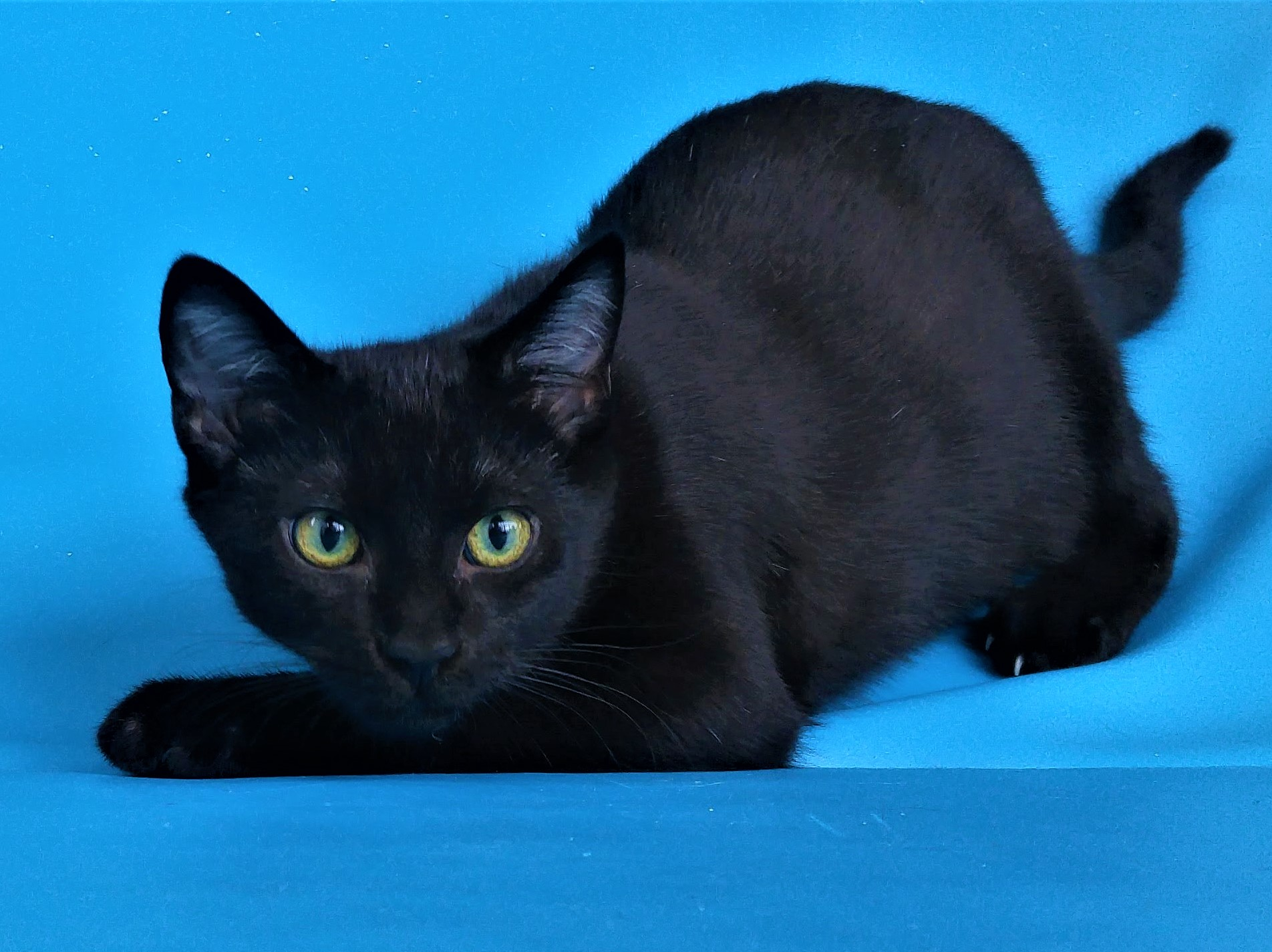
Some cultures superstitiously attribute good or bad luck to black cats.

In ancient Egypt, cats were revered. The goddess Bastet was often depicted in cat form, sometimes taking on the war-like aspect of a lioness. The Greek historian Herodotus reported that killing a cat was forbidden, and when a household cat died, the entire family mourned and shaved their eyebrows. Families took their dead cats to the sacred city of Bubastis, where they were embalmed and buried in sacred repositories. Herodotus expressed astonishment at the domestic cats in Egypt, because he had only ever seen wildcats.

Ancient Greeks and Romans kept weasels as pets, which were seen as the ideal rodent-killers. The earliest unmistakable evidence of the Greeks having domestic cats comes from two coins from Magna Graecia dating to the mid-fifth century BC showing Iokastos and Phalanthos, the legendary founders of Rhegion and Taras respectively, playing with their pet cats. The usual ancient Greek word for 'cat' was ailouros, meaning 'thing with the waving tail'. Cats are rarely mentioned in ancient Greek literature. Aristotle remarked in his History of Animals that "female cats are naturally lecherous". The Greeks later syncretized their own goddess Artemis with the Egyptian goddess Bastet, adopting Bastet's associations with cats and ascribing them to Artemis. In Ovid's Metamorphoses, when the deities flee to Egypt and take animal forms, the goddess Diana turns into a cat.

Cats eventually displaced weasels as the pest control of choice because they were more pleasant to have around the house and were more enthusiastic hunters of mice. During the Middle Ages, many of Artemis's associations with cats were grafted onto the Virgin Mary. Cats are often shown in icons of Annunciation and of the Holy Family; according to Italian folklore, on the same night that Mary gave birth to Jesus, a cat in Bethlehem gave birth to a kitten.

Several ancient religions believed cats are exalted souls, companions or guides for humans, that are all-knowing but mute so they cannot influence decisions made by humans. In Japan, the maneki neko cat is a symbol of good fortune. In Norse mythology, Freyja, the goddess of love, beauty, and fertility, is depicted as riding a chariot drawn by cats. In Jewish legend, the first cat was living in the house of the first man Adam as a pet that got rid of mice. The cat was once partnering with the first dog before the latter broke an oath they had made which resulted in enmity between the descendants of these two animals. It is also written that neither cats nor foxes are represented in the water, while every other animal has an incarnation species in the water. Although no species are sacred in Islam, cats are revered by Muslims. Some Western writers have stated Muhammad had a favorite cat, Muezza. He is reported to have loved cats so much, "he would do without his cloak rather than disturb one that was sleeping on it". The story has no origin in early Muslim writers, and seems to confuse a story of a later Sufi saint, Ahmed ar-Rifa'i, centuries after Muhammad. One of the companions of Muhammad was known as Abu Hurayrah ("father of the kitten"), in reference to his documented affection to cats.

=== Superstitions and rituals ===
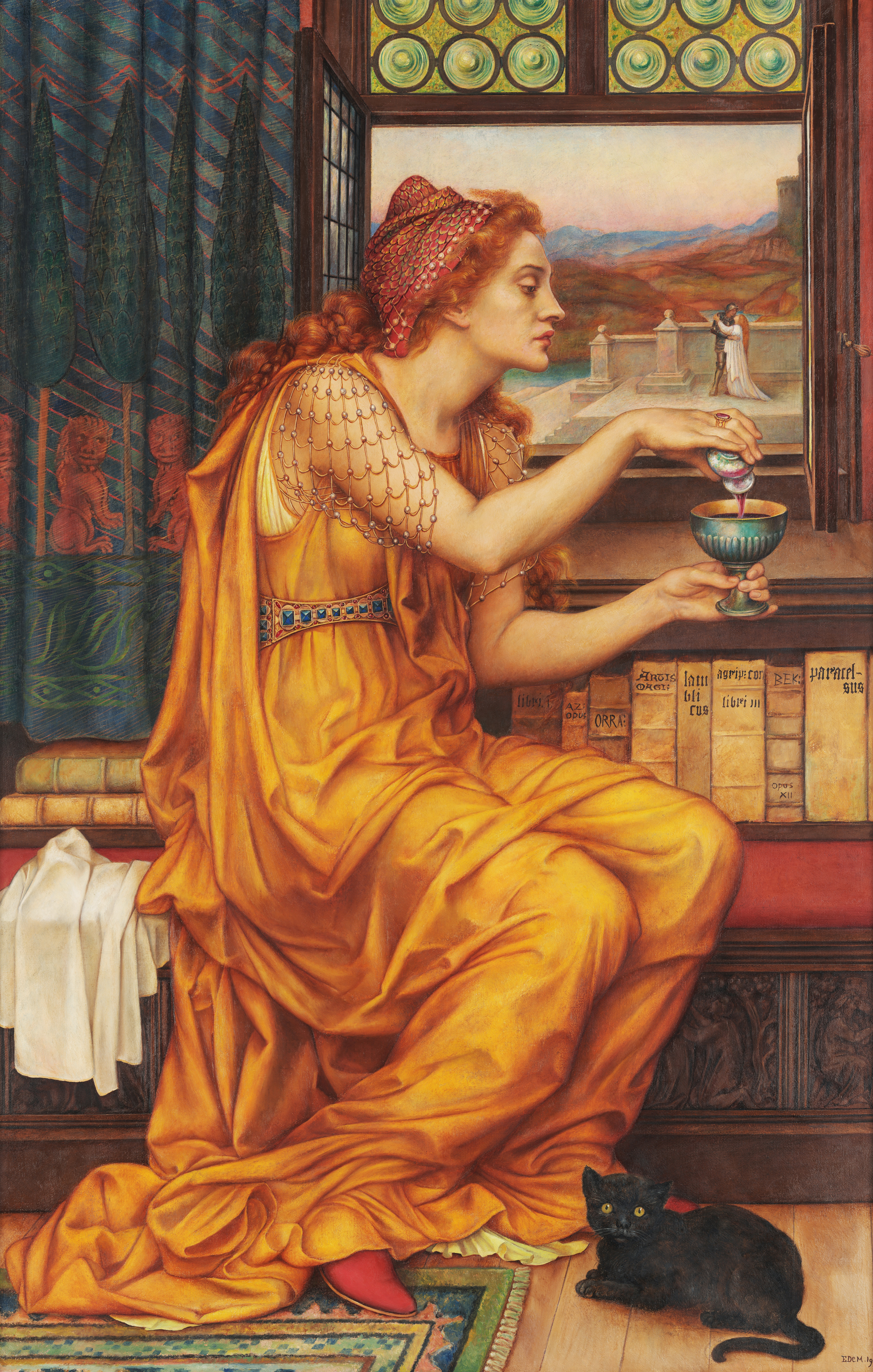
The Love Potion is a 1903 painting by Evelyn De Morgan depicting a witch with a black cat.

Many cultures have negative superstitions about cats. For example, that encountering a black cat ("crossing one's path") leads to bad luck, or that cats are witches' familiar spirits used to augment a witch's powers and skills. The killing of cats in medieval Ypres, Belgium, is commemorated in the innocuous present-day Kattenstoet (cat parade).

According to a myth in many cultures, cats have nine lives. In Italy, Germany, Greece, Brazil, and some Spanish-speaking regions, they are said to have seven lives, while in Arabic traditions, the number of lives is six. An early mention of the myth is in John Heywood's The Proverbs of John Heywood (1546):

Husband, (quoth she), ye studie, be merrie now,
And even as ye thinke now, so come to yow.
Nay not so, (quoth he), for my thought to tell right,
I thinke how you lay groning, wife, all last night.
Husband, a groning horse and a groning wife
Never faile their master, (quoth she), for my life.
No wife, a woman hath nine lives like a cat.

The myth is attributed to the natural suppleness and swiftness cats exhibit to escape life-threatening situations. Falling cats often land on their feet, using an instinctive righting reflex to twist their bodies around.

== See also ==
- Aging in cats
- Ailurophobia
- Animal testing on cats
- Cancer in cats
- Cat bite
- Cat café
- Cat collar
- Cat fancy
- Cat lady
- Cat food
- Cat meat
- Cat repeller
- Cats and the Internet
- Cats in Australia
- Cats in New Zealand
- Cats in the United States
- Cat–dog relationship
- Dog
- Dried cat
- Feral cats in Istanbul
- List of cat breeds
- List of cat documentaries, television series and cartoons
- List of individual cats
- List of fictional felines
- List of feline diseases
- Neko-dera
- Perlorian
- Pet door
- Pet first aid
- Popular cat names
