= Hellenic Red Cross =

Greek humanitarian organization

- Ελληνικός Ερυθρός Σταυρός
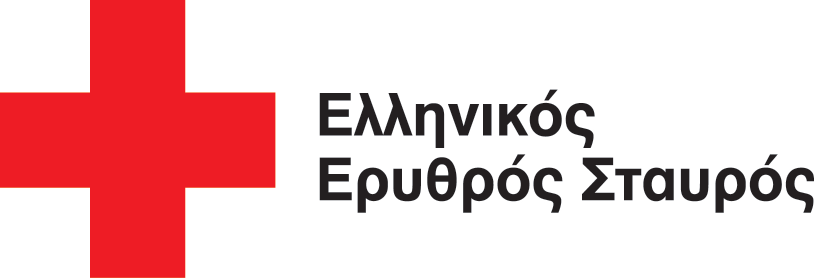
- Hellenic Red Cross logo
- Abbreviation: HRC (Greek: ΕΕΣ)
- Formation: 10 June 1877; 149 years ago
- Type: Nonprofit organization
- Headquarters: Athens, Greece
- Region served: Greece
- Parent organization: International Federation of Red Cross and Red Crescent Societies
- R.O.R. Id: https://ror.org/00zzcmy73
- Website: https://www.redcross.gr

The Hellenic Red Cross (Greek: Ελληνικός Ερυθρός Σταυρός, ΕΕΣ, romanized: Ellinikós Erythrós Stavrós, EES) is the Greek national Red Cross Society, founded on 10 June 1877. In 1912 the School of Nurses is founded, in 1932 the Volunteer Samaritans Corps starts its operations and in 1964 the Social Welfear Sector is also founded, broadening the services of Hellenic Red Cross in a wider area of the Greek society. The Youth of Hellenic Red Cross was founded in 1924. The Hellenic Red Cross has regional branches across the Greece.

The Hellenic Red Cross has established First Aid Stations, Blood Donation Centres, Schools at Hellenic Red Cross - Branches in Greece, Nurses’ Advanced School (Ανωτέρα Σχολή Νοσηλευτριών) in Athens, Memorandum of Understanding (MoU) with various entities, Missing Persons Search Service (tracing and family reunification), and several hospitals: the Asclepeion Hospital in Voula, the Henry Dunant Hospital Center in Athens, and the Red Cross Hospital, Athens.

== Volunteer Corps ==
Hellenic Red Cross volunteers are organized into three corps: the Volunteer Nursing Corps, Volunteer Social Welfare Corps, and Volunteer Corps of Samaritans, Rescuers and Lifeguards.

Hellenic Red Cross – Division of Volunteer Corps of Samaritans, Rescuers and Lifeguards was founded in 1932. It is a member of International Life Saving Federation. It has launched a free mobile app for the public. The Training Department is certified and follows an ISO 9001:2008 quality management system by Lloyd's Register Quality Assurance. It operates schools and training short courses:

- Basic Life Support (BLS) (Cardiopulmonary Resuscitation, Automated External Defibrillator, Abdominal thrusts).
- First Aid for Dogs.
- First Aid.
- Mental Health First Aid.
- Mental Health First Aid for Children.
- School of First Aid, 15 months in duration.
- School of Junior Samaritans, 24 months.
- School of Lifeguards, 3 months.
- School of Rescue, 3 months.

== Corruption ==
In February 2019, the former president of the Hellenic Red Cross Andreas Martinis was convicted by the Athens Criminal Court of Appeal in the First Instance to seven years' suspended imprisonment for six counts of repeated service unfaithfulness. According to the indictment, during the period 2007-2010 he exploited funds earmarked for distressed patients in order to give preferential treatment to the hospitalization rates of prominent persons, which allegedly caused damage to the Henry Dunant Hospital of EUR 22 million.

In May 2019, Andreas Martinis and his wife were sentenced by the Athens Three-Member Criminal Court of Appeal to 10 years' suspended imprisonment for the offence of money laundering in the amount of 3.1 million German marks, with the mitigating circumstance of a previous honest life. The case concerns the signing of a contract between the 'Henry Dunant' Foundation and the German company 'Hospitalia International' in 1998 for the supply of hospital and hotel equipment.

== See also ==
- First aid kit
- Erythros Stavros
- List of hospitals in Greece
- International Committee of the Red Cross
- List of Red Cross and Red Crescent Societies
- International Federation of Red Cross and Red Crescent Societies
