= List of cat documentaries, television series and cartoons =

List of cat documentaries, television series and cartoons includes serious documentaries, television series and cartoons, in alphabetical order, related to cats .

== Documentaries ==
- Cat Empire: Docuseries (2021), Ubique Film
- Cats: Caressing the Tiger (1991), National Geographic
- Cats: Choosing, Caring and Training (2008), Revolution LLC
- Kedi (2016), Termite Films
- The Lion in Your Living Room (2015), Canadian Broadcasting Company
- Science of Cats (2014), National Geographic
- Secret Life of Cats (2014), National Geographic
- The Standard of Perfection: Show Cats (2009), Public Broadcasting Service
- Understanding Cats (2009), Public Broadcasting Service
- The World of Cats (2008), Columbia River Entertainment
- Inside The Mind of a Cat (2022), Netflix

=== Big cats documentaries ===
- Big Cats (2018, 3 episodes), BBC
- Lions of Darkness (1993) National Geographic
- Lions of the African Night (1987) National Geographic
- Tiger King: Murder, Mayhem and Madness (2020, 7 episodes), Netflix

=== Documentary and reality series ===
- Cats 101 (2009–2012), Animal Planet
- My Cat from Hell (2011–2016), Animal Planet
- Must Love Cats (2011–2012), Animal Planet

== Cartoons ==
- Garfield (1978–present; TV series 1988–1994, 2009–2016, 2019–2020), Universal Press Syndicate
- Heathcliff (1980–1981, 1984–1985), Ruby-Spears Productions, et al.
- The Itchy & Scratchy Show (1988–1997, as an element of The Simpsons), 20th Television
- Krazy Kat (1913–1944), King Features Syndicate
- The Ren and Stimpy Show (1991-1996, 2003, 2024-present), Nickelodeon
- Simon's Cat (2008–present), Simon's Cat Ltd
- Space Cats (1991-1992), Marvel Productions, et al.
- The Secret Lives of Waldo Kitty (1975), Filmation
- SWAT Kats: The Radical Squadron (1993-1994), Hanna-Barbera
- Tom and Jerry (1940–1958, 1961–1962, 1963–1967, 1975, 1980–1982, 1990–1993, 2006–2008, 2014–2021), Hanna-Barbera, et al.
- Top Cat (1961–1962), Hanna-Barbera
- The Twisted Tales of Felix the Cat (1995-1997), Felix the Cat Productions, et al.
