= Pet first aid =

Emergency care for domestic animals

Pet first aid refers to emergency treatment administered to an injured or sick domestic animal before professional medical care is available. Much of the first aid administered to pets is similar to that administered to humans, but with some distinct differences, specifically when referring to their anatomy.

Significant pet first aid theory can be learned through reliable internet sources, but this is to be used as a learning resource only, whereas in an emergency, a pet owner should not simply go online.

Comprehensive websites with qualified veterinarian writers are available to discuss the symptoms and treatments of certain conditions, in addition to recommending whether first aid treatment will be sufficient or a veterinary visit will be necessary.

== Suggested measures ==
There are several authoritative resources that outline basic measures that can be adopted or administered on the part of pet owners to help deal with pet emergencies. Although these are considered safe to follow, they are not recognized as definitive care since only emergency medical technicians are aware of the correct protocol and procedure especially for immediate aid and specific therapy. The goal is to ensure that the pet gets through an emergency or a life-threatening event long enough for medical help to arrive. One of the most important of these is pet restraint. A humane restraint is necessary to ensure that the pet does not harm the owner and other people around. Secondly, it will also prevent the pet from inflicting further harm since animals tend to struggle when suffering from injury or pain. There are different types of safe restraints (e.g. muzzles, nylon leash) and most first-aid books for pets outline each of these, including how they can be administered.

It is also encouraged that the pet owner should remain calm. The prospect of losing a beloved pet could induce one to get stressed or could lead to panic. However, an injured animal is already frightened and the owner will only aggravate the situation if he could not get himself under control. A loss in focus could lead to an inability to determine what needs to be done such as getting it to the nearest vet. It is also helpful if there is a first aid kit at home or in the car. Veterinarians can provide recommendations as to its contents.

== Pet first aid courses ==
Pet first aid courses are available to pet owners and people who work with pets. This is particularly crucial when determining the type of injury or emergency so that the owner is in a better position to respond appropriately. Many pet related businesses that involve looking after pets require staff to be trained in pet first aid.

=== Course topics ===
Pet first aid courses are designed to equip pet owners with the information and skills needed to assess the situation, administer the appropriate care, or stabilize an injured pet until qualified veterinary care can be obtained. Courses typically include preventive care (avoiding illness and injuries). Students usually learn the importance of immediate medical attention following an injury, how to properly restrain and transport an injured animal. Attending a course in person, typically allow for more hands-on learning (such as practice bandaging, often on live pets) to be included, however distance learning courses and shorter duration lecture classes are also available.
