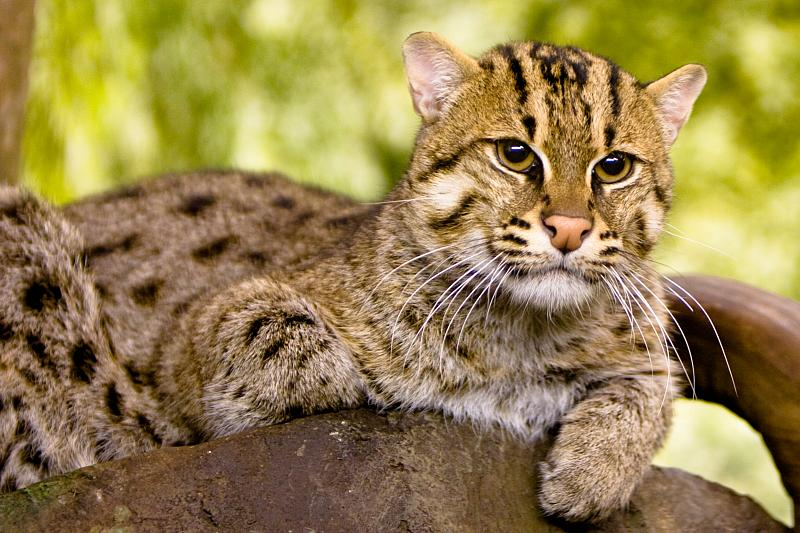
- At Cincinnati Zoo and Botanical Garden, Ohio

Conservation status
- Vulnerable (IUCN 3.1)
- CITES Appendix II

Scientific classification
- Kingdom: Animalia
- Phylum: Chordata
- Class: Mammalia
- Order: Carnivora
- Family: Felidae
- Genus: Prionailurus
- Species: P. viverrinus

Binomial name
- Prionailurus viverrinus (Bennett, 1833)
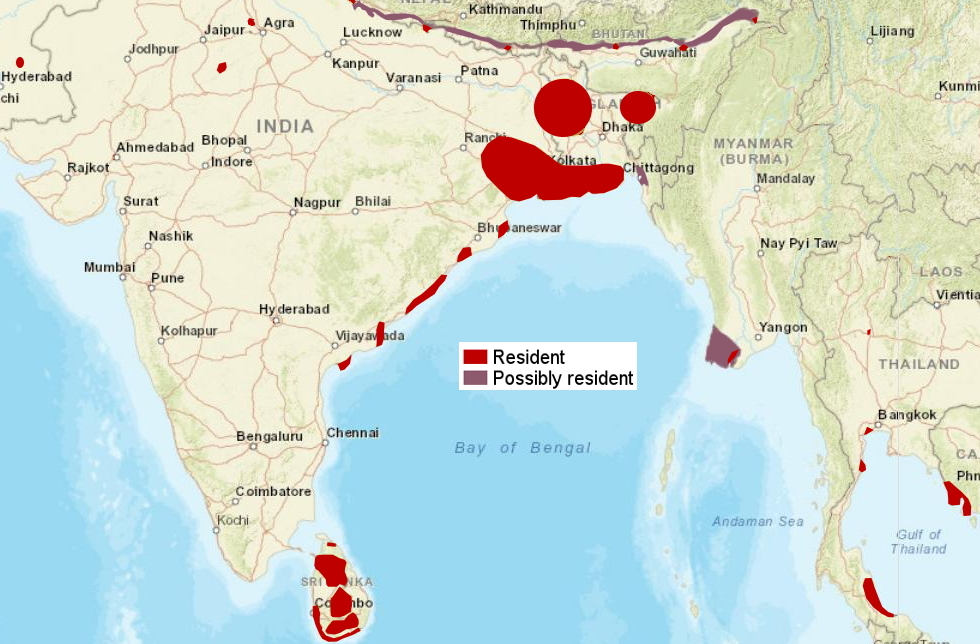
- Distribution of the fishing cat as of 2016

= Fishing cat =

Small wild cat

The fishing cat (Prionailurus viverrinus) is a medium-sized wild cat of South and Southeast Asia. It has a deep yellowish-grey fur with black lines and spots. Adults have a head-to-body length of 57 to 78 cm (22 to 31 in), with a 20 to 30 cm (8 to 12 in) long tail. Males are larger than females, weighing 8 to 17 kg (18 to 37 lb), while females average 5 to 9 kg (11 to 20 lb). It lives mostly in the vicinity of wetlands, along rivers, streams, oxbow lakes, in swamps and mangroves where it preys mostly on fish. Other prey items include birds, insects, small rodents, molluscs, reptiles including snakes, amphibians and carrion of cattle. The fishing cat is thought to be primarily nocturnal. It is a good swimmer and can swim long distances, even underwater.

The fishing cat has been listed as a vulnerable species on the IUCN Red List since 2016, as the global population is thought to have declined by about 30% in the past three fishing cat generations during the period 2010–2015. The destruction of wetlands and killing by local people are the major threats throughout its range.

== Taxonomy ==
Felis viverrinus was proposed by Edward Turner Bennett in 1833, who described a cat skin sent from India by Josiah Marshall Heath. The genus name Prionailurus was proposed by Nikolai Severtzov in 1858 for spotted wild cats native to Asia. A subspecies Felis viverrinus rhizophoreus was proposed in 1936 by Henri Jacob Victor Sody, who described a specimen from the north coast of West Java that had a slightly shorter skull than fishing cat specimens from Thailand. There is evidence that the nominate taxon and the Javan fishing cat are distinguishable by skull morphometrics.

=== Phylogeny ===
Phylogenetic analysis of the nuclear DNA in tissue samples from all Felidae species revealed that the evolutionary radiation of the Felidae began in Asia in the Miocene around 14.45 to 8.38 million years ago. Analysis of mitochondrial DNA of all Felidae species indicates a radiation at around 16.76 to 6.46 million years ago.

The Prionailurus species are estimated to have had a common ancestor between 8.16 to 4.53 million years ago, and 8.76 to 0.73 million years ago. Both models agree in the rusty-spotted cat (P. rubiginosus) having been the first cat of the Prionailurus lineage that genetically diverged, followed by the flat-headed cat (P. planiceps) and then the fishing cat. It is estimated to have diverged together with the leopard cat (P. bengalensis) between 4.31 to 1.74 million years ago and 4.25 to 0.02 million years ago. The following cladogram shows the phylogenetic relationships of the fishing cat as derived through analysis of nuclear DNA:

- Felidae
  - Felinae
    - - - Prionailurus
          - - - - Leopard cat
                - Fishing cat
              - Flat-headed cat
            - Rusty-spotted cat
        - Otocolobus
          Pallas's cat (O. manul)
    - other lineages
  - Pantherinae

== Characteristics ==
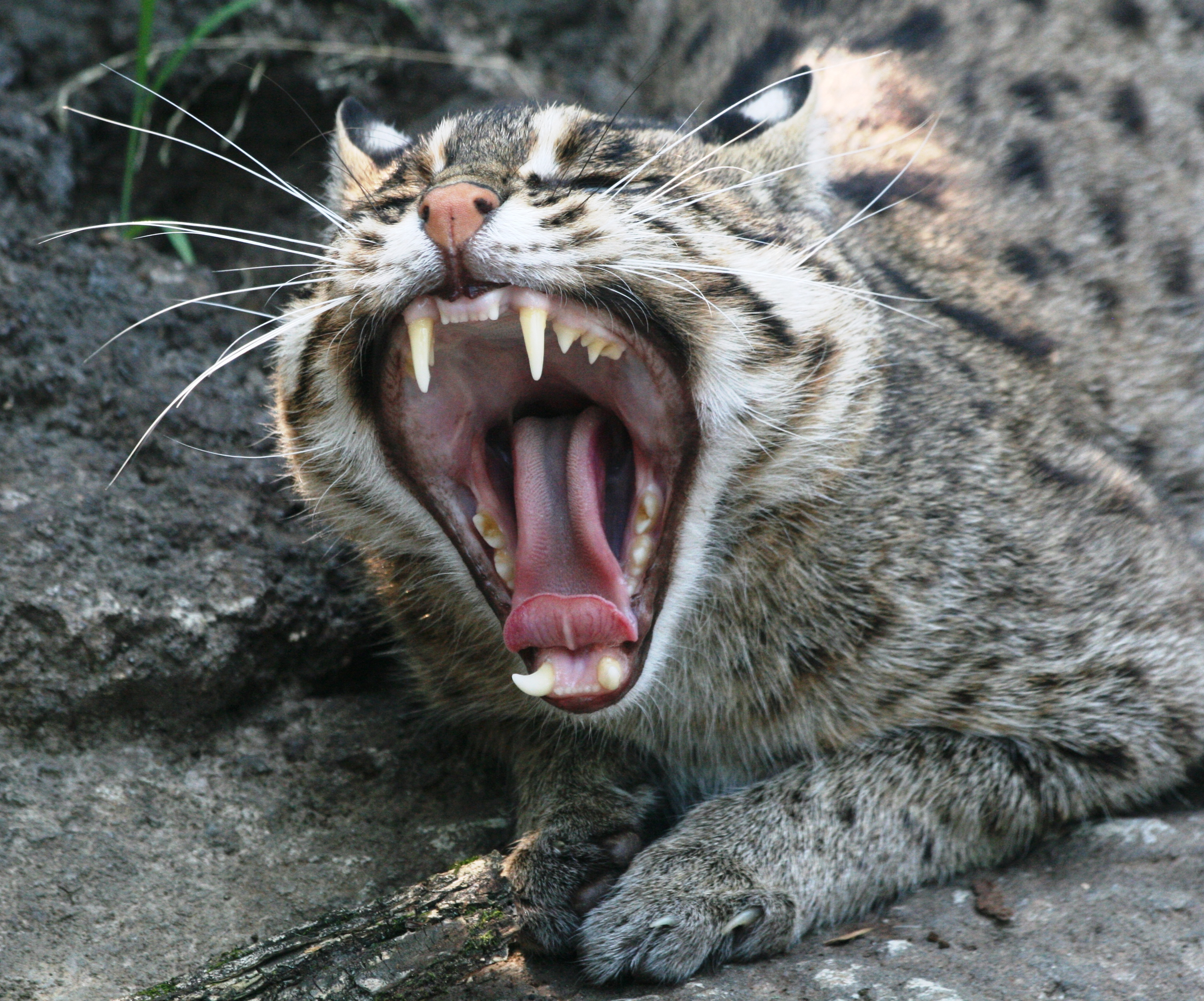
A fishing cat at the National Zoological Park

The fishing cat has a deep yellowish-grey fur with black lines and spots. Two stripes are on the cheeks, and two are above the eyes running to the neck with broken lines on the forehead. It has two rows of spots around the throat. The spots on the shoulder are longitudinal, and those on the sides, limbs and tail are roundish. The background colour of its fur varies between individuals from yellowish tawny to ashy grey, and the size of the stripes ranges from narrow to broad. The fur on the belly is lighter than on the back and sides. The short and rounded ears are set low on the head, and the back of the ears bear a white spot. The tail is short, less than half the length of head and body, and with a few black rings at the end. The short dense layered fur is thought to be an aquatic adaptation providing a water barrier and thermal insulation, while another layer of protruding long guard hairs provides its pattern and glossy sheen.

The fishing cat is the largest cat of the Prionailurus. It is stocky and muscular with a head-to-body length ranging from 57 to 78 cm (22 to 31 in), a tail length of 20 to 30 cm (8 to 12 in) and medium to short legs. Females weigh 5 to 9 kg (11 to 20 lb) and males 8 to 17 kg (18 to 37 lb), showing pronounced sexual dimorphism. Its skull is elongated, with a basal length of 123–153 mm (4.8–6.0 in) and a post-orbital width of 27–31 mm (1.1–1.2 in). Its tongue is about 12 cm (4.7 in) long and has large, cylindrical papillae near the front.

Fishing cat paws are partly webbed, and the claws are incompletely sheathed, only becoming partially covered when fully retracted. It is about twice the size of a domestic cat.

== Distribution and habitat ==
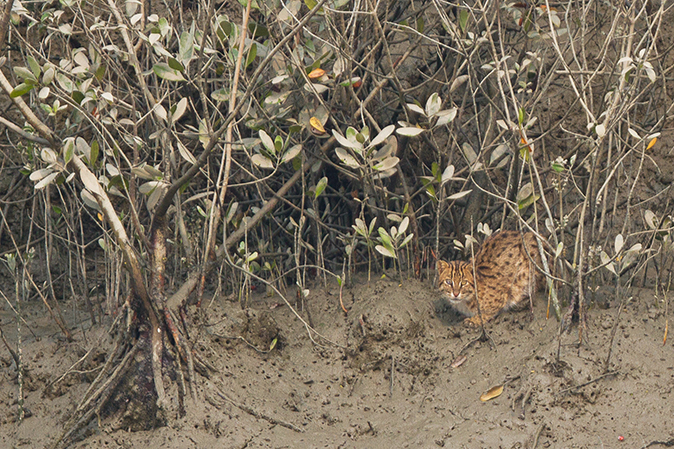
A fishing cat in the Sundarbans

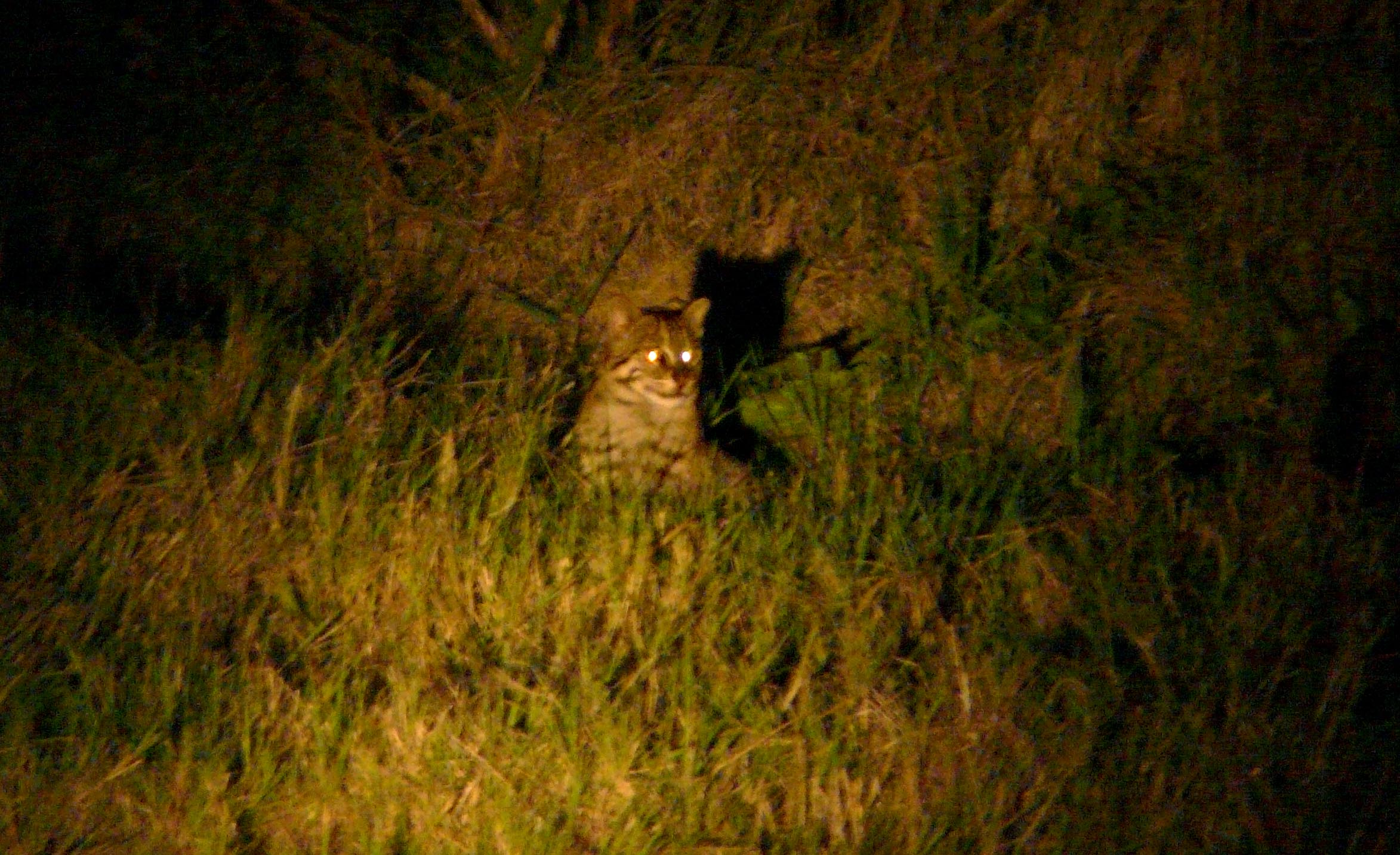
A fishing cat in Nepal

The fishing cat is broadly but discontinuously distributed in South and Southeast Asia. It predominantly inhabits densely vegetated wetlands around slow-moving bodies of water like swamps and marshes. These include low-salinity bodies such as oxbow lakes, and high-salinity ones such as tidal creeks and mangrove forests. Along these bodies of water, it conceals itself within the thick cover of forests, shrublands, reed beds and grasslands. Most records are from lowland areas.

In Pakistan's Sindh Province, the fishing cat was recorded in the Chotiari Dam area in 2012. In the Nepal Terai, it has been recorded in Shuklaphanta, Bardia, Chitwan and Parsa National Parks and in Koshi Tappu Wildlife Reserve. In India, its presence has been documented in Ranthambore National Park, in Pilibhit, Dudhwa and Valmiki Tiger Reserves, in Sur Sarovar Bird Sanctuary, outside protected areas in West Bengal, in Lothian Island Wildlife Sanctuary in the Sundarbans, in Odisha's Bhitarkanika Wildlife Sanctuary and coastal districts outside protected areas, in Andhra Pradesh's Coringa Wildlife Sanctuary, Krishna Wildlife Sanctuary and adjoining reserve forests. Reports in Bangladeshi newspapers indicate that fishing cats live in most divisions of Bangladesh. In Sri Lanka, it has been recorded in tea estates, Maduru Oya National Park and multiple localities in coastal to hilly regions.

In Myanmar, it was recorded in the Ayeyarwady Delta in 2016 and 2018. In Thailand, its presence has been documented in Khao Sam Roi Yot National Park, Thale Noi Non-Hunting Area and in Kaeng Krachan National Park. Between 2007 and 2016, it was also recorded near wetlands outside protected areas in Phitsanulok Province, Bang Khun Thian District, Samut Sakhon, Phetchaburi and Songkhla Provinces, and near a mangrove site in Pattani. In Cambodia, a single fishing cat was photographed by a camera trap in Kulen Promtep Wildlife Sanctuary in March 2003. In 2015, it was also recorded in Peam Krasop Wildlife Sanctuary and Ream National Park. The island of Java constitutes the southern limit of the fishing cat's range, but by the 1990s fishing cats were thought to be scarce and restricted to tidal forests with sandy or muddy shores, older mangrove stands, and abandoned mangrove plantation areas with fishponds. There are no confirmed records in Peninsular Malaysia, Vietnam and Laos.

== Behaviour and ecology ==
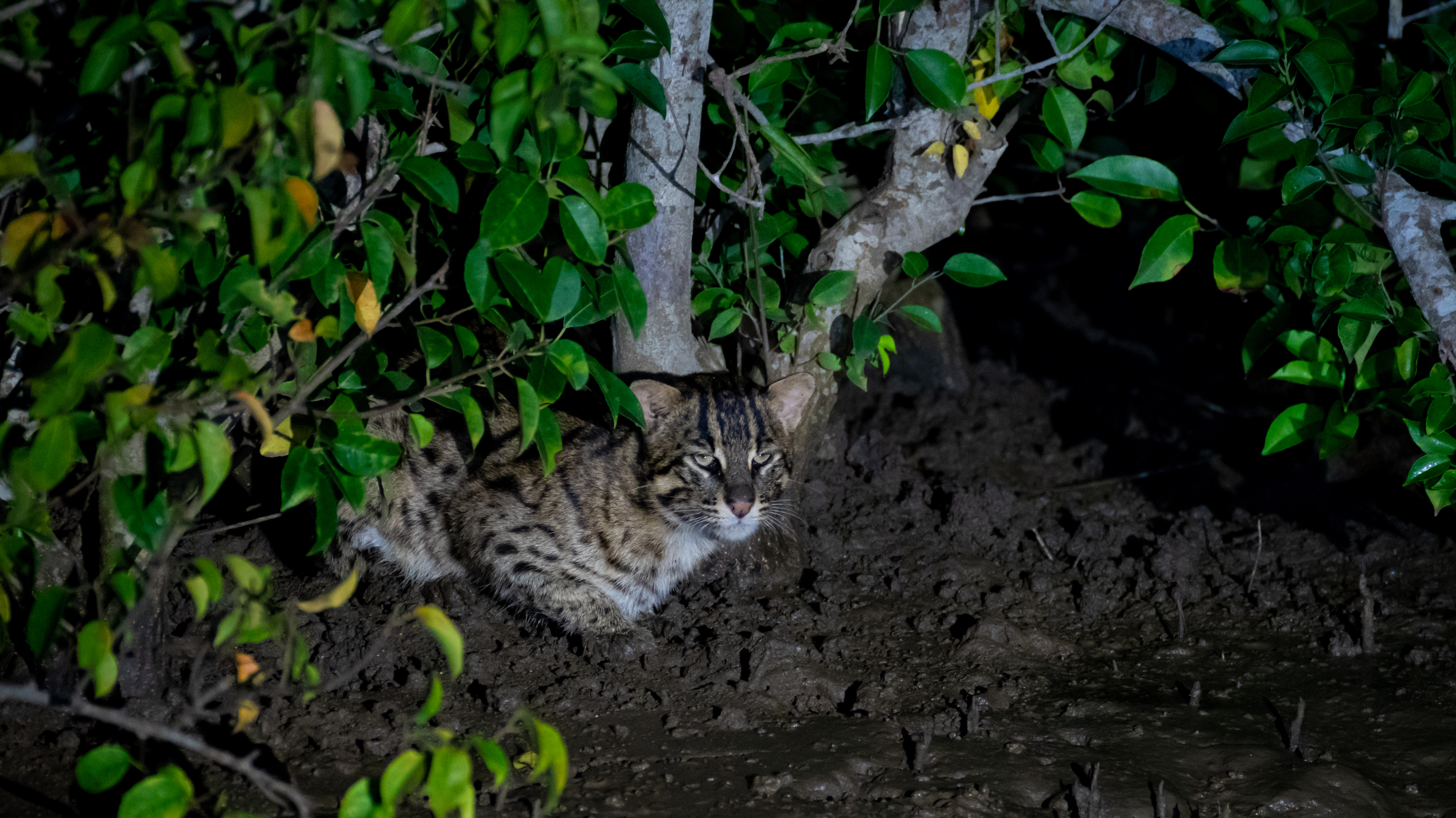
A fishing cat in the Godavari mangroves at night

The fishing cat lives among dense vegetation near water and is thought to be primarily nocturnal. It is known to be a proficient long-distance and underwater swimmer. Adult males and females without dependent young are solitary. Females have been reported to range over areas of 4 to 6 km^{2} (1.5 to 2.3 sq mi), while males range over 16 to 22 km^{2} (6.2 to 8.5 sq mi). It has been observed resting in thick grassy habitats, often near a water body but sometimes far away from them. Adults have been recorded to vocalise "chuckling" sounds. It marks its home range using cheek-rubbing, head rubbing, chin rubbing, neck rubbing and urine-spraying to leave scent marks; it also sharpens its claws and displays flehmen. The pungent smell of fishing cat urine markings is due to 3-Mercapto-3-methylbutan-1-ol, a breakdown product of felinine.

Fishing cat feces collected in India's Keoladeo National Park revealed that fish comprises about three-quarter of its diet, with the remainder consisting of birds, small rodents and insects; molluscs, reptiles, amphibians, carrion of cattle and grass supplement its diet. Its main prey in the Godavari River delta is fish, including flathead grey mullet, green chromide and Mozambique tilapia, which comprised three fifths of its diet, whereas rodents and crabs made up the remainder of the diet. The diet make-up remained relatively constant throughout the year. Fishing cats have been observed while hunting along the edges of watercourses, grabbing prey from the water, and sometimes diving into the water to catch prey further from the banks. It prefers hunting in shallow water and spends about half the time lying in wait for prey to approach.

=== Reproduction and development ===
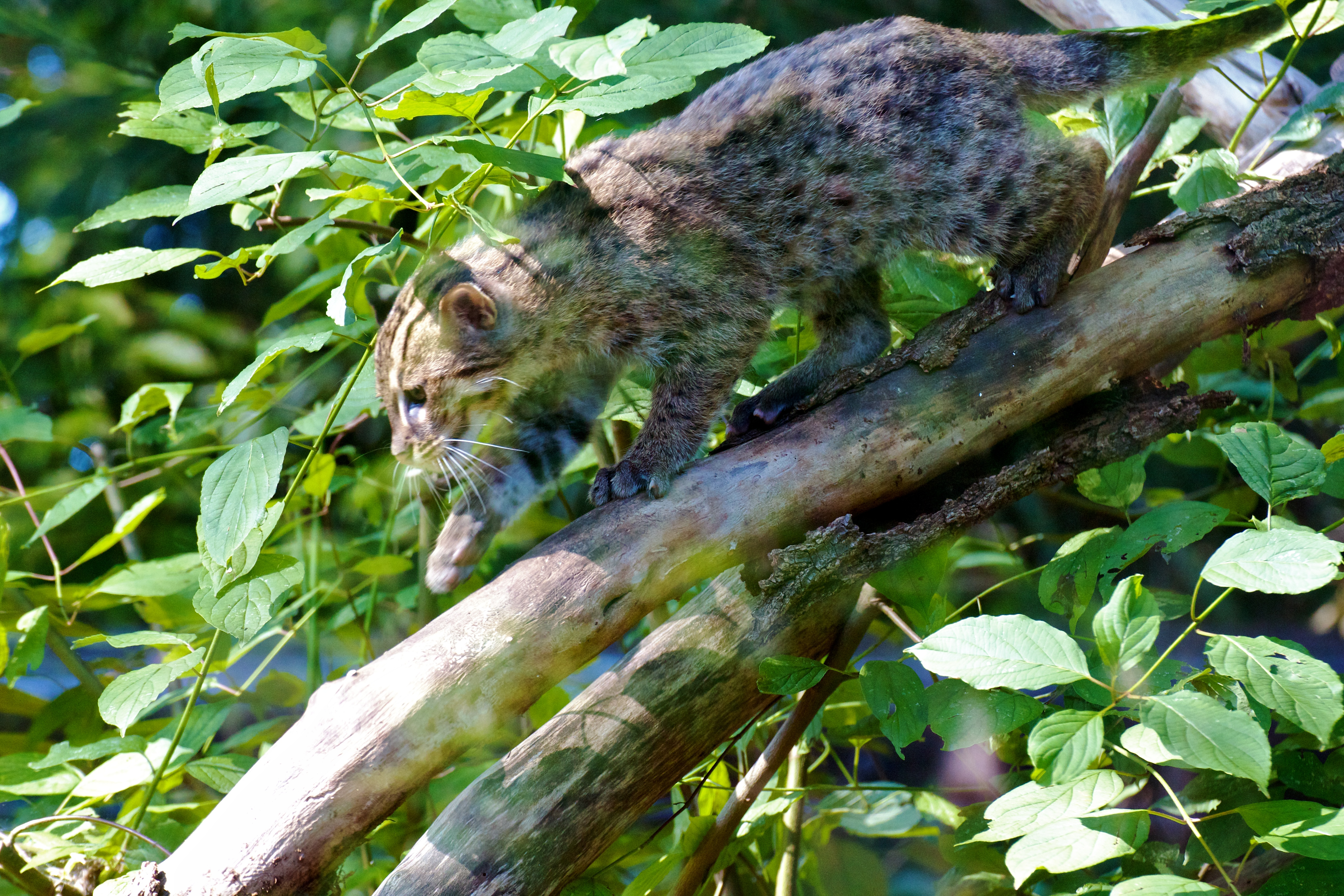
Juvenile fishing cat at the National Zoological Park

Wild fishing cats most likely mate during January and February; most kittens in the wild were observed in March and April. However, fishing cats may mate as late as June. In captivity, the gestation period lasts 63–70 days; females give birth to an average of two to three kittens; the litter size can be as small as one to as large as four. Kittens weigh around 170 g (6.0 oz) at birth and are able to actively move around by the age of one month. They begin to play in water and to take solid food when about two months old, but are not fully weaned until six months old. They reach full adult size when about eight and a half months old, acquire their adult canine teeth by 11 months and are sexually mature when approximately 15 months old. They live up to 10 years in captivity. The generation length of the fishing cat is five years.

=== Health ===
Fishing cats are susceptible to carnivore protoparvovirus, a disease known to kill them. This disease significantly damages the kidney, spleen and gastrointestinal tract of the body. The fishing cat is also vulnerable to diseases and medical conditions such as feline hemoplasmas, transitional cell carcinoma and canine distemper virus. One captive individual was even recorded with chlamydiota. Additionally, in a 2012 case study, Toxocara cati was reported as the cause of death of young captive fishing cats.

== Threats ==
Since 2016, the fishing cat is listed as a vulnerable species on the IUCN Red List, as the global population is thought to have declined by around 30% in the years 2010–2015; the destruction of wetlands and killings by local people are major threats to the fishing cat. The destruction of wetlands includes increased pollution or conversion for agricultural use and human settlements. The conversion of mangrove forests to commercial aquaculture ponds is a major threat in Andhra Pradesh, and in some places fishing cats are killed. Over-exploitation of local fish stocks and retaliatory killing by local people are also significant threats. The fishing cat's habitat in India is predominantly marshlands, which are subject to agricultural usage under the country's laws, resulting in human–wildlife conflict. Coastal wetlands are an important habitat for the fishing cat in Thailand and Cambodia, however, estimates predict that only 6% of wetlands remain undisturbed.

In West Bengal's Howrah district, 27 dead fishing cats were recorded between April 2010 and May 2011, and in Sagar Island, the fishing cat was possibly extirpated by local people for reasons unknown. Deaths are more frequent in the dry season, when people use wetlands more frequently. At least 30 fishing cats were killed by local people in Bangladesh between January 2010 and March 2013. They are often killed because they are mistaken as tiger cubs. In Thailand, 31% of radio-collared fishing cats were killed by local people between 2012 and 2015. Fish farmers in Koshi Tappu Wildlife Reserve have killed fishing cats in retaliation for perceived loss of fish. Roadkills are a major mortality factor in Odisha. The fishing cat is possibly extinct in coastal Kerala, but it is doubtful whether it ever occurred there at all.

== Conservation ==
The fishing cat is included on CITES Appendix II and protected by national legislation over most of its range. Hunting is prohibited in Bangladesh, China, India, Indonesia, Myanmar, Nepal, Pakistan, Sri Lanka, and Thailand. Hunting regulations apply in Laos. In Bhutan, Malaysia, and Vietnam, it is not protected outside protected areas, and no information is known about its legal protections in Cambodia. It is the state animal of the Indian state of West Bengal. Its survival depends on protection of wetlands, prevention of indiscriminate trapping, snaring and poisoning.

In areas where habitat degradation is a major concern, such as coastal Andhra Pradesh, non-governmental organizations are working to slow habitat conversion in collaboration with local villagers. Part of this work involves creating alternative livelihood programs that allow villagers to earn money without damaging natural habitats. A Fishing Cat Conservation Alliance provides an umbrella for the cooperation of national fishing cat conservation groups, which began with the establishment of India's in 2010.

=== In captivity ===
Fishing cat captive breeding programmes have been established by the European Association of Zoos and Aquaria and the American Association of Zoos and Aquariums. All the fishing cats kept in zoos around the world are listed in the International Studbook of the World Association of Zoos and Aquariums. Zoos in Thailand house around 30 individuals; birth rates are not particularly high. They have been placed in captivity as an "insurance population" due to their vulnerable status in the wild.
