= Cat communication =

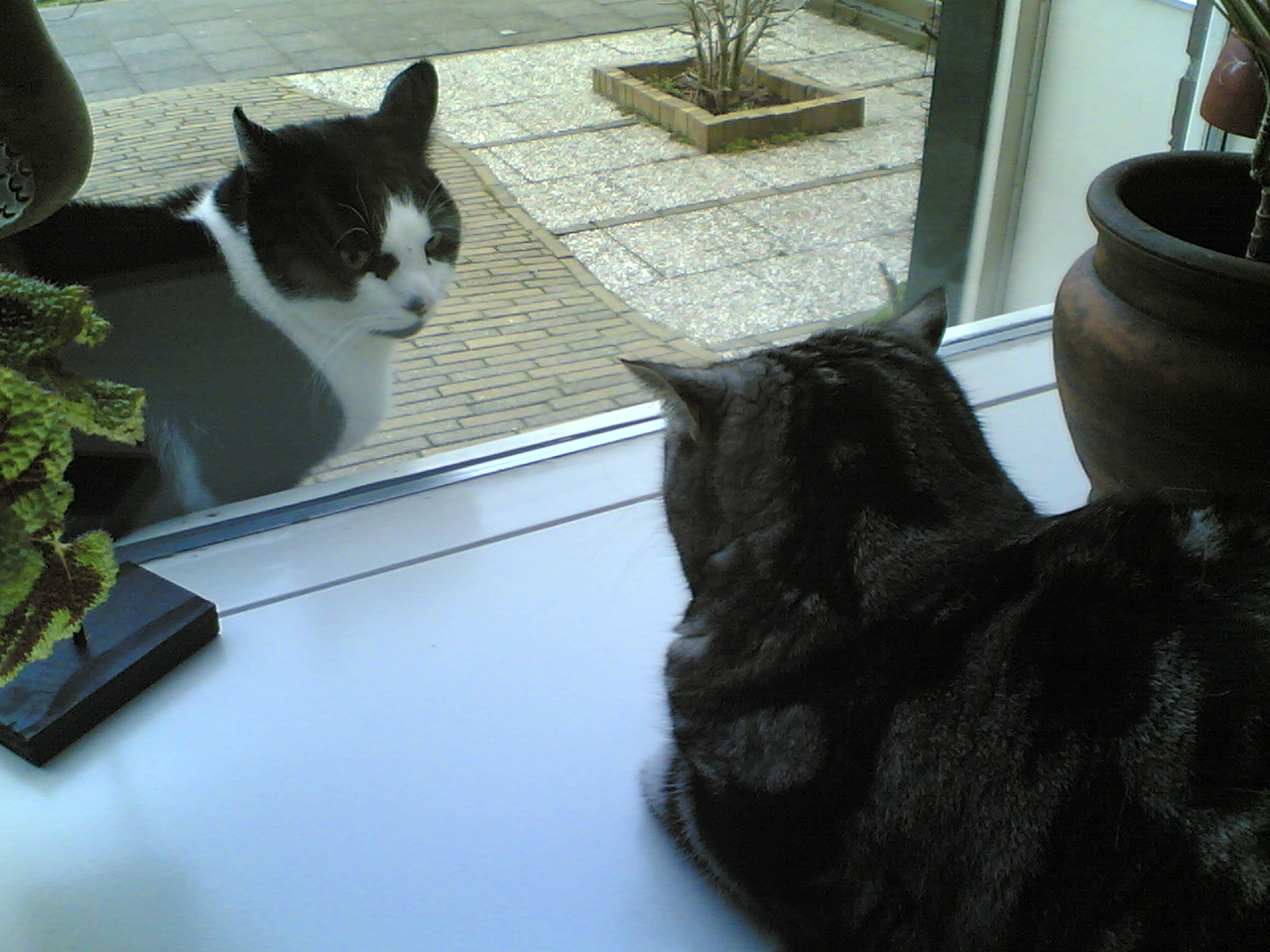
A primary form of cat communication is body language, such as the position of the ears.

Cats communicate for a variety of reasons, including to show happiness, express anger, solicit attention, and observe potential prey. Additionally, they collaborate, play, and share resources. When cats communicate with humans, they do so to get what they need or want, such as food, water, attention, or play. As such, cat communication methods have been significantly altered by domestication. Studies have shown that domestic cats tend to meow much more than feral cats. They rarely meow to communicate with fellow cats or other animals. Cats can socialize with each other and are known to form "social ladders", where a dominant cat leads a few lesser cats. This is common in multi-cat households.

Cats can use a range of communication methods, including vocal, visual, tactile and olfactory communication. Up to 21 different cat vocalizations have been observed. They use visual signals, or body language, to express emotions like relaxation, fear, and aggression. Cats use several types of tactile behaviors to communicate, such as grooming or biting each other. They also use olfactory communication, such as marking their territory via urine.

== Vocal communication ==
A cat meowing

A Siberian cat vocalizing

Cat vocalizations have been categorized according to a range of characteristics. In 1944, Mildred Moelk published the first phonetic study of cat sounds and classified the 16 different vocal patterns into three main classes:

1. sounds produced with the mouth closed (murmurs – purring, trilling)
2. sounds produced when the mouth is first opened and then gradually closed (meowing, howling, yowling)
3. sounds produced with the mouth held tensely open in the same position (growls, snarls, hisses, spits, chattering, and chirping).

Moelk used a phonetic alphabet to transcribe or write down the different sounds. She claimed that cats had six different forms of meows to represent friendliness, confidence, dissatisfaction, anger, fear, and pain. Moelk classified eight other sounds involved in mating and fighting.

Brown et al. categorized the vocal responses of cats based on the behavioral context. These contexts include situations such as the separation of kittens from mother cats, instances of food deprivation, pain responses, occurrences before or during threatening or aggressive behaviors (e.g., disputes over territory or food), episodes of acute stress or pain (e.g., routine prophylactic injections), and instances of kitten deprivation. Less common calls from mature cats included purring, conspecific greeting calls or murmurs, extended vocal dialogues between cats in separate cages, "frustration" calls during training, or extinction of conditioned responses.

Owens et al. categorized cat vocalizations based on their acoustic structures. There are three categories: tonal sounds, pulse sounds, and broadband sounds. Tonal sounds are further categorized into groups of harmonically structured sounds or regular tonal sounds. Pulse vocalizations are separated into pulse bursts and hybrid pulse bursts with tonal endings. Broadband sounds are separated into four groups: non-tonal broadband sounds, broadband sounds with tonal beginnings, broadband sounds with short tonal elements, and broadband sounds with long tonal endings.

Miller classified vocalizations into categories according to the sound produced: the purr, meow, chirrup, chirp, call, and growl/snarl/hiss, and the howl/moan/wail.

=== Purr ===
Video of a cat purring

The purr is a continuous, soft, vibrating sound. The reason why cats purr is still uncertain, along with the mechanism used to produce the noise. Cats may purr for a variety of reasons, including when they are hungry, happy, or anxious. In some cases, purring is thought to be a sign of contentment and encouragement for further interaction. Purring is believed to indicate a positive emotional state, but cats sometimes purr when they are ill, tense, or experiencing traumatic or painful moments such as giving birth. It has also been suggested that purring can act as a soothing mechanism and can promote healing.

Scientists from the University of Vienna researching cat vocalizations found that the larynxes made a purring sound when air was passed through them, meaning that muscle contraction is not required. Instead, the sounds were made possible by connective tissue embedded in the vocal folds that lowered the frequency of the sounds they produced. When an animal purrs, its vocal cords vibrate at a low frequency, which creates a distinctive rumbling sound produced with harmonics. One hypothesis, supported by electromyographic studies, is that cats produce the purring noise by using the vocal folds and/or the muscles of the larynx to alternately dilate and constrict the glottis rapidly, causing air vibrations during inhalation and exhalation.

Purring is sometimes accompanied by other sounds, though this varies between individual cats. Some may only purr, while others emit low-level outbursts. It was once believed that only cats of the genus Felis could purr, but researchers now know that members of genus Panthera (tigers, lions, jaguars and leopards) can produce sounds similar to purring, albeit only when exhaling.

=== Meow ===
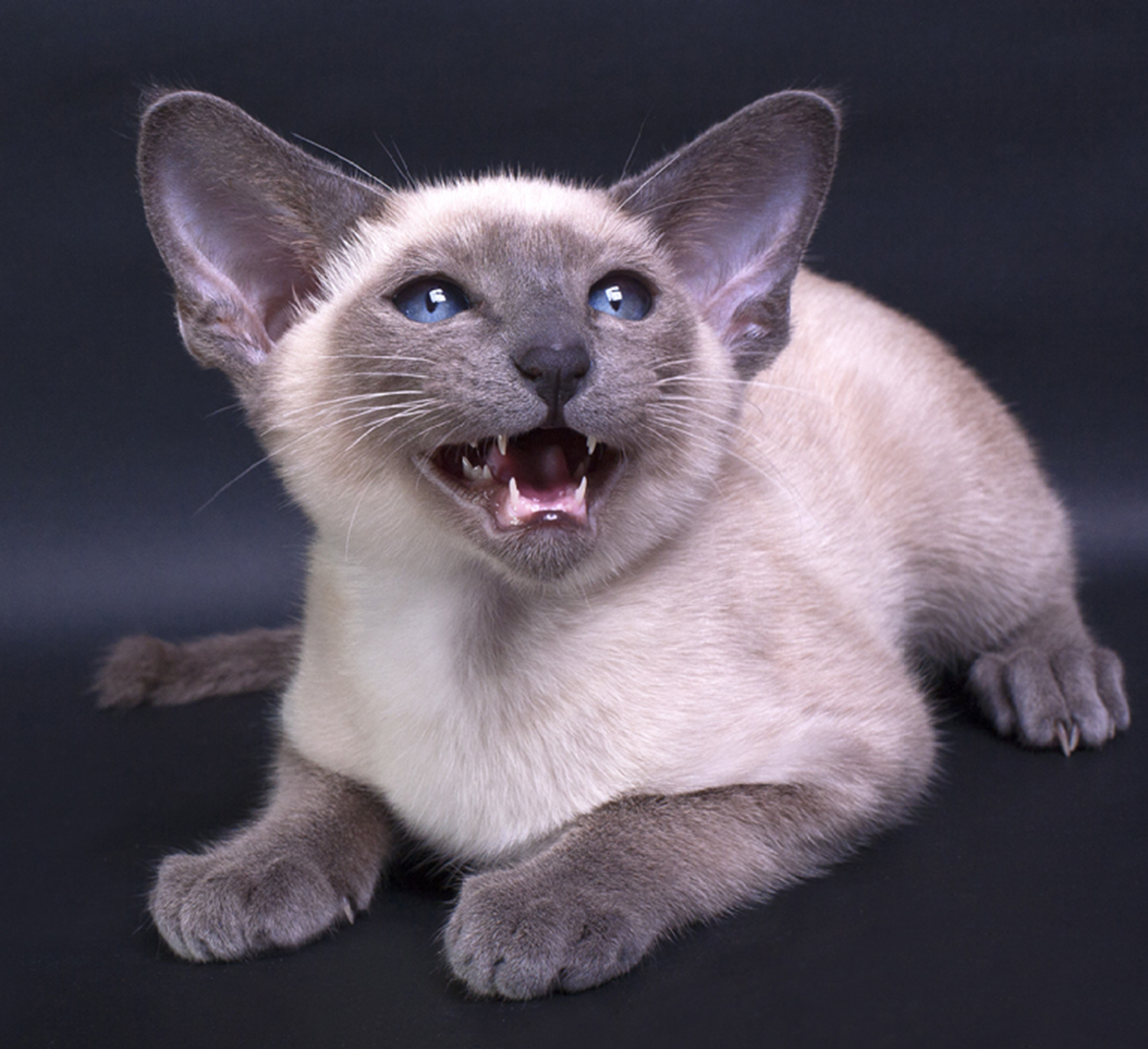
A cat meowing for attention

The most familiar sounds of adult cats are "meow" or "miaow" (pronounced /miˈaʊ/). A meow can be assertive, plaintive, friendly, bold, welcoming, attention-soliciting, demanding, or complaining. It can even be silent, where the cat opens its mouth but does not produce any sound.

A mew is a high-pitched meow that is often produced by domestic kittens. It is apparently used to solicit attention from their mother, but they are also used by adult cats. By around three to four weeks of age, kittens do not meow when at least one littermate is present, and at four to five months of age, kittens stop mewing altogether. Adult cats rarely meow to each other, and so adult meowing to human beings is likely to be a post-domestication extension of mewing by kittens.

Although videos which seemingly show cats speaking in human language are frequently shared on the internet, differences in cats' vocal tract prevent them from vocalising human language exactly. Instead, animal behaviour experts explain they are modifying the "meow" vocalisation to mimic certain human words. For example, a cat which frequently hears its owner say "no" may learn to use "mow" in a low tone.

=== Chirrup ===
The chirrup, also referred to as a chirr or trill, sounds like a meow rolled on the tongue. It is commonly used by mother cats to call their kittens inside the nest. As such, kittens recognize their own mother's chirp, but they do not respond to the chirps of other mothers. It is also used in a friendly manner by cats when they are greeted by another cat or a human. Therefore, people can mimic the sound to reassure and greet pet cats.

=== Chirp ===
A cat chattering at birds

Cats sometimes make excited chirping or chattering noises when observing or stalking prey. These sounds range from quiet clicking sounds to a loud but sustained chirping mixed with an occasional meow.

An article from The Spruce Pets argues that chattering and chirping mimic prey such as birds and rodents. It is used as a hunting strategy.

=== Call ===
The call is a loud, rhythmic sound, that may be made with the mouth closed. It is primarily associated with female cats soliciting males, and sometimes occurs in males when fighting with each other. A caterwaul is the cry of a cat in heat.

=== Growl, spit, hiss ===
A cat spitting at a shadow

The growl, spit, and hiss are sounds associated with either offensive or defensive aggression. They are usually accompanied by a postural display intended to have a visual effect on the perceived threat. Cats growl, hiss, and spit as a display of defense against both cats and other species, such as dogs. If the hiss and growl warning does not remove the threat, an attack may follow. It is also used to scare intruders away from their territory. Kittens as young as two to three weeks may hiss and spit when first picked up by a human. Spitting is a shorter but louder and more emphatic version of hissing.

=== Howl, moan, and wail ===
The howl, moan, and wail sounds are commonly vocalized during threatening situations. Howls are more tonal, while moans are long and slowly modulated. On the other hand, anger wails are combined with growls, while yowls are similar to howls but longer.

== Visual communication ==
A cat hissing and arching its back to make itself appear larger to ward off a threat

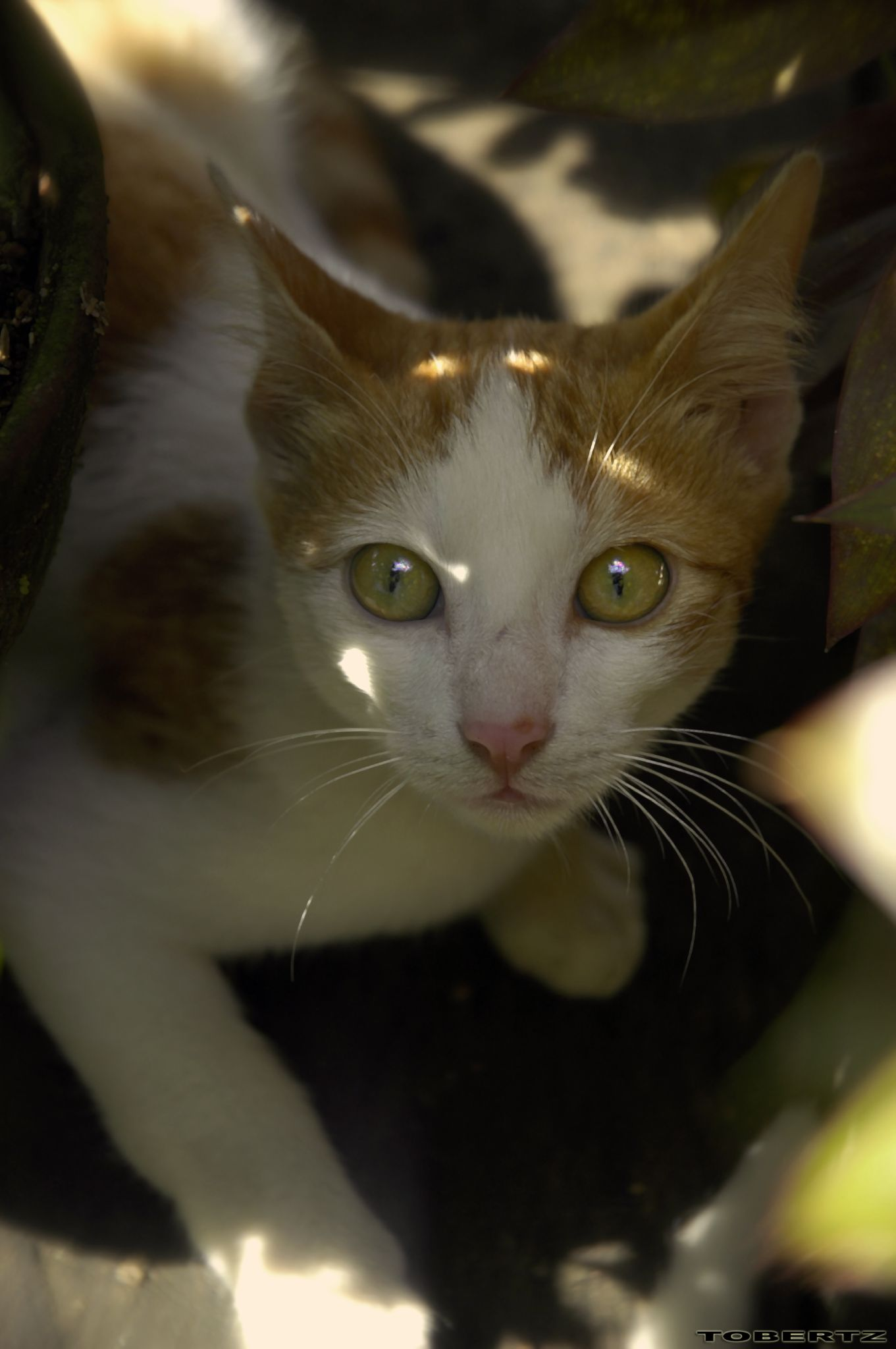
Surprised cats have enlarged pupils and erect ears held slightly backward

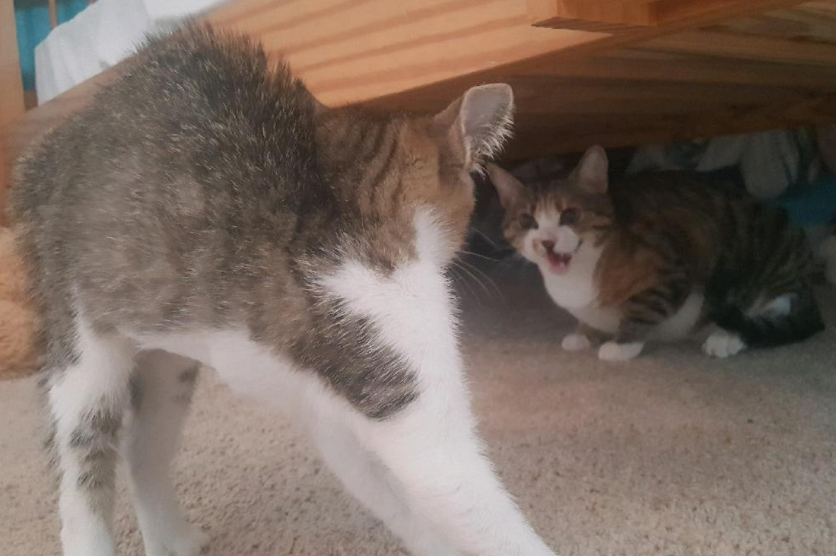
A tabby cat hissing at a Cyprus cat; the Cyprus cat is arched with erect hair to appear larger and threatening

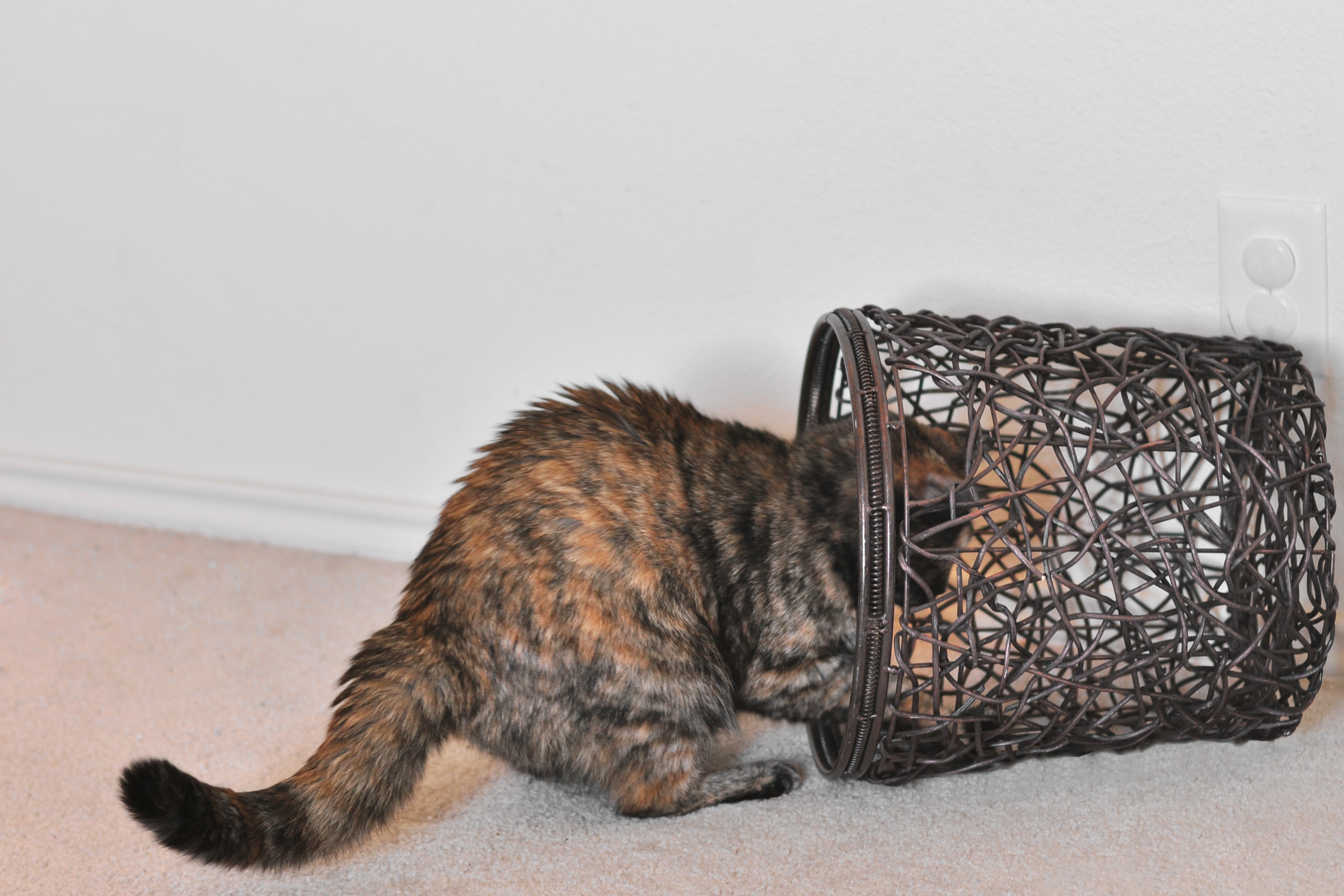
The hairs on the tail of this tortoiseshell cat are erect, indicating excitement or curiosity.

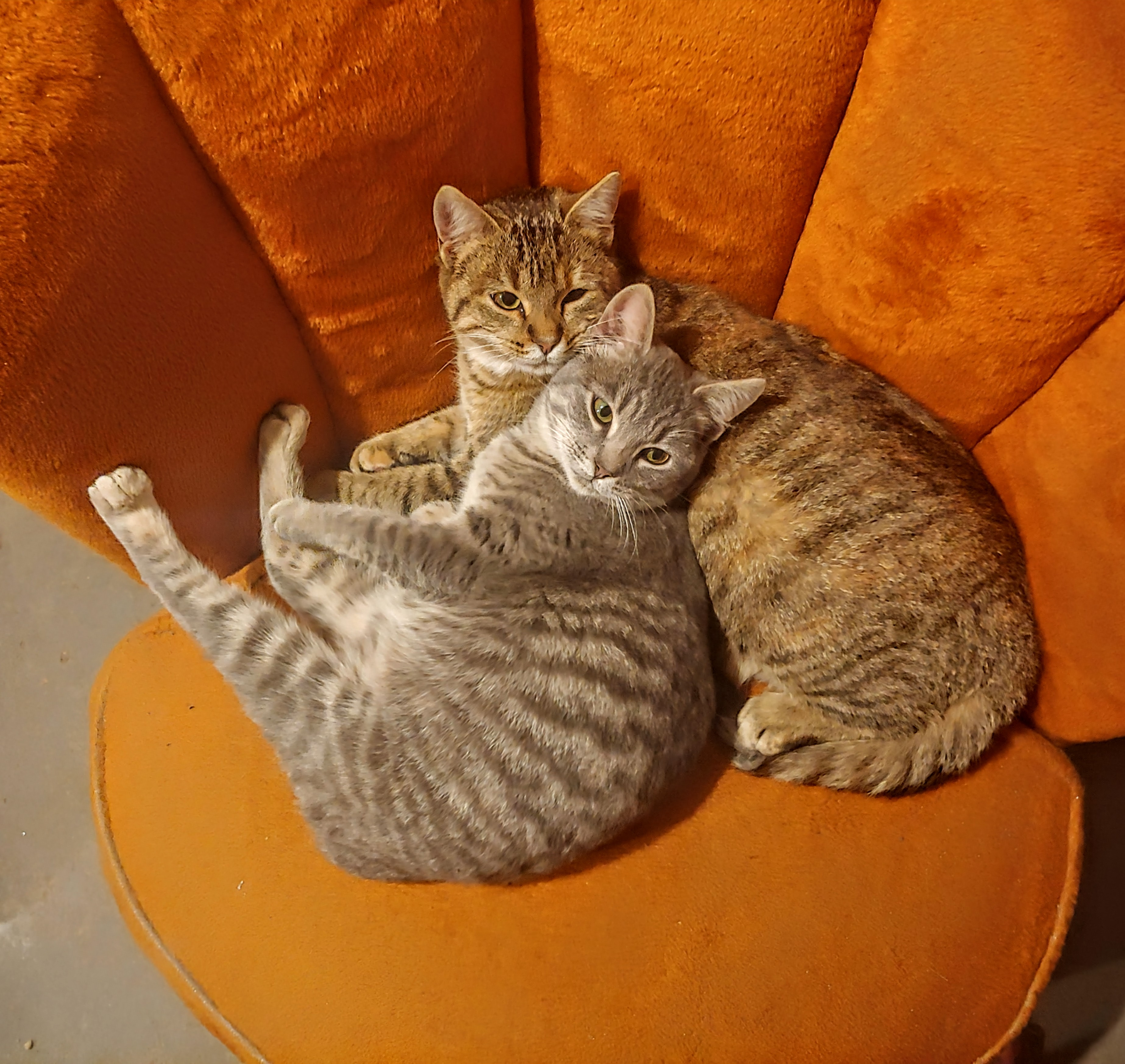
These two cats are lying in close contact with each other, which conserves each cat's body heat. Lying on their belly and side, respectively, signals relaxation.

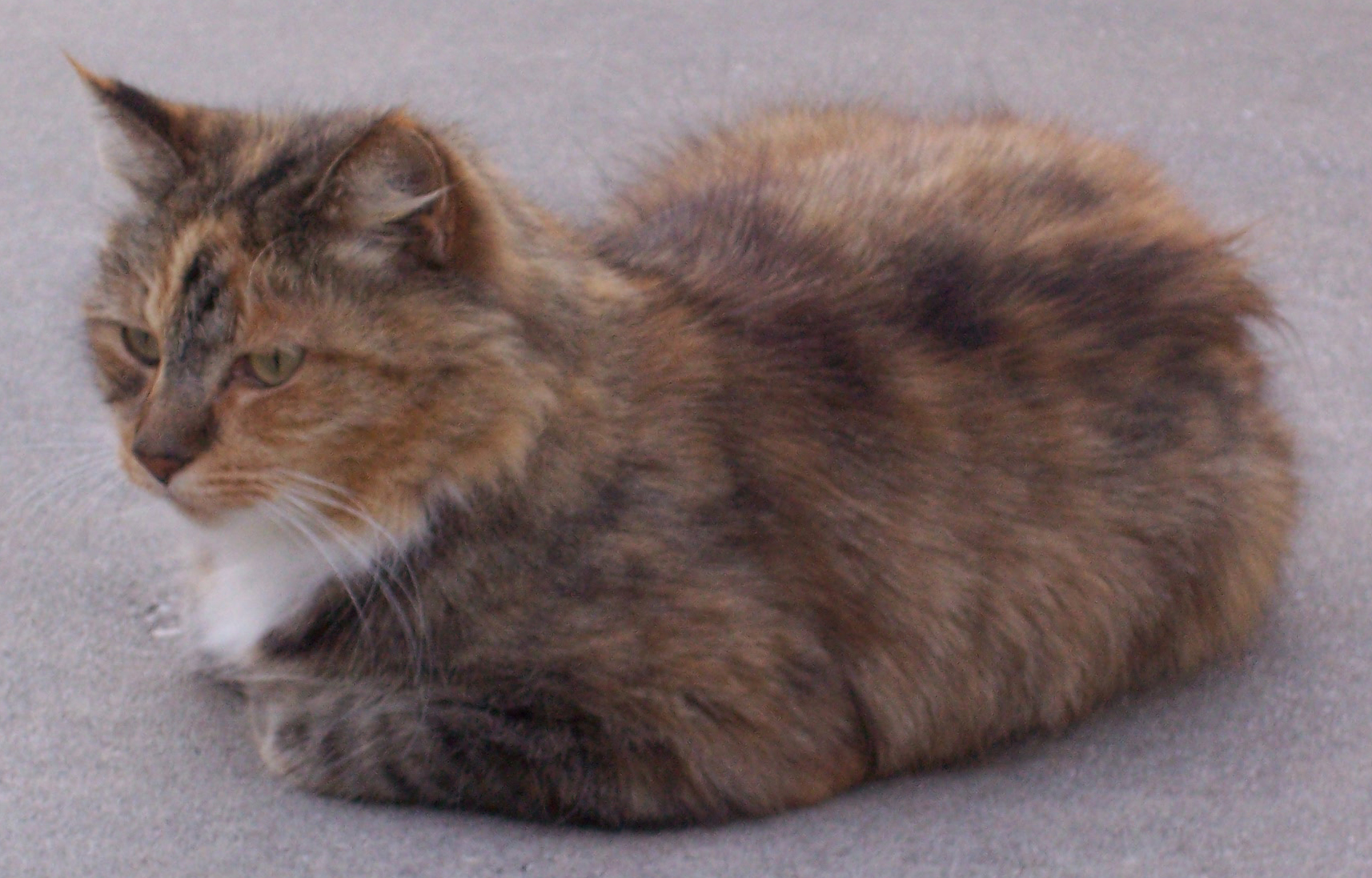
A cat in the loaf position

Cats use body language and movement to communicate a wide range of feelings and information. There are various responses such as when cats arch their backs, erect their hairs and adopt a sideward posture to communicate fear or aggression. Other visual communication can be a single behavioral change (as perceived by humans) such as slowly blinking to signal relaxation and comfort in their environment. Domestic cats frequently use visual communication with their eyes, ears, mouths, tails, coats and body postures. The change in a cat's facial features can be a strong indicator of their communication.

=== Body language ===
A cat's posture can be friendly or aggressive, depending on the situation. Some of the most basic and familiar cat postures include:

- Relaxed – The cat is seen lying on the side or sitting. Its breathing is slow to normal, with legs bent, or hind legs laid out or extended. Its tail is loosely wrapped, extended, or held up; when a cat is standing but calm (i.e., at a moderately low level of neurobiological arousal), its tail tends to be still and may hang down loosely.
- Loafing – The cat has paws tucked in its body, with its body low to the ground, and tail underneath or around the body. Cats may do this when they are relaxed or cold.
- Stretching – This posture also indicates that the cat is relaxed. When cats lie on their back with their bellies exposed, they are in a position of vulnerability. Therefore, this position may communicate a feeling of trust or comfort. They may also roll onto their backs to defend themselves with their claws or to bask in areas of bright sunlight.
- Yawning – Sometimes combined with a stretch, this is another posture of a relaxed cat. Having the mouth open and no teeth exposed indicates playfulness.
- Fearful – The cat is lying on its belly or crouching directly on top of its paws. Its entire body may be shaking and very near the ground when standing up; Breathing is also fast, with its legs bent near the surface, and its tail curled and very close to its body when standing on all fours. As such, a fearfully defensive cat makes itself smaller, lowers itself toward the ground, arches its back and leans its body away from the threat rather than forward. Fighting usually occurs only when escape is impossible.
- Terrified – The cat is crouched directly on top of its paws, with visible shaking seen in some parts of the body. Its tail is close to the body, and might be propped up, together with its hair on the back. The legs are very stiff or bent to increase their size. Typically, cats avoid contact when they feel threatened, although they can resort to varying degrees of aggression when they feel cornered, or when escape is impossible.
- Aggressive – The hind legs stiffen, the rump elevated, but the back stays flat; while tail hairs are erected. The nose is pushed forward and the ears are pulled back slightly. Since cats have both claws and teeth, they can easily cause injury if they become involved in a fight, so this posture is an attempt to elicit deference from a competitor without fighting. The aggressor may attempt to make the challengers retreat and will pursue them if they do not flee.
- Confident – The cat may walk around in a more comfortable manner with its tail up to the sky. Cats often walk through houses with their tails standing up high above them.
- Alert – The cat is lying on its belly, or it may be sitting; Its back is almost horizontal when standing and moving; Its breathing normal, with its legs bent or extended (when standing); Its tail is curved back or straight upward and may twitch when positioned downward.
- Tense – The cat is lying on its belly, with the back of its body lower than its upper body (slinking) when standing or moving back; Its hind legs are bent and front legs are extended when standing, and the tail is close to the body, tensed or curled downward; there can be twitching when the cat is standing up.
- Anxious/ovulating – The cat is lying on its belly, while the back of the body is more visibly lower than the front part when the cat is standing or moving. Its breathing may be fast, and its legs are tucked under its body. The tail is close to the body and maybe curled forward (or close to the body when standing), with the tip of the tail moving up and down (or side to side). The tail is also moved to the side when ready to be mounted by the male cat.

=== Ears ===
Cats can change the position of their ears very quickly, and continuously. They are erect when the cat is alert and focused, slightly relaxed when the cat is calm, and flattened against the head when extremely defensive or aggressive. In cats, flattened ears generally indicate that it feels threatened and may attack used as a defense or attack posture.

=== Eyes ===
A direct stare by a cat usually communicates a challenge or threat and is more likely to be seen in high-ranking cats; lower-ranking cats usually withdraw in response. The direct stare is often used during predation or for territorial reasons. In contrast to a direct stare, cats will lower their eyelids or slowly blink them to show trust and affection to their owners.

=== Tail ===
Cats often use their tails to communicate. For example, a cat holding its tail vertically generally indicates positive emotions such as happiness or confidence; the vertical tail is often used as a friendly gesture toward people or other cats. Additionally, a cat may twitch its tail when playing. A half-raised tail can indicate less pleasure, and discontent is indicated with a tail held low. A cat's tail may swing from side to side, and if this motion is slow and "lazy", it generally indicates that the cat is in a relaxed state. Cats will twitch the tip of their tails when hunting, alert, or playful. A stalking domestic cat will typically hold its tail low to the ground while in a crouch, and twitch it quickly from side to side. This tail behavior is also observed when a cat becomes "irritated" and is about to lash out and attack typically done by biting or scratching with the claws extended.

When playing, a cat, usually a kitten, may raise the base of its tail high and stiffen all but the tip into a shape like an upside-down "U". This signals great excitement, to the point of hyperactivity. It may also be seen when younger cats chase each other, or when they run around by themselves. When greeting their owners, cats often hold their tails straight up with a quivering motion that indicates extreme happiness. A scared or surprised cat may erect the hairs on its tail and back. It may stand more upright and turn its body sideways to increase its apparent size as a threat. Tailless cats, such as the Manx, which possess only a small stub of a tail, move the stub around as if they have a full tail.

=== Panting ===
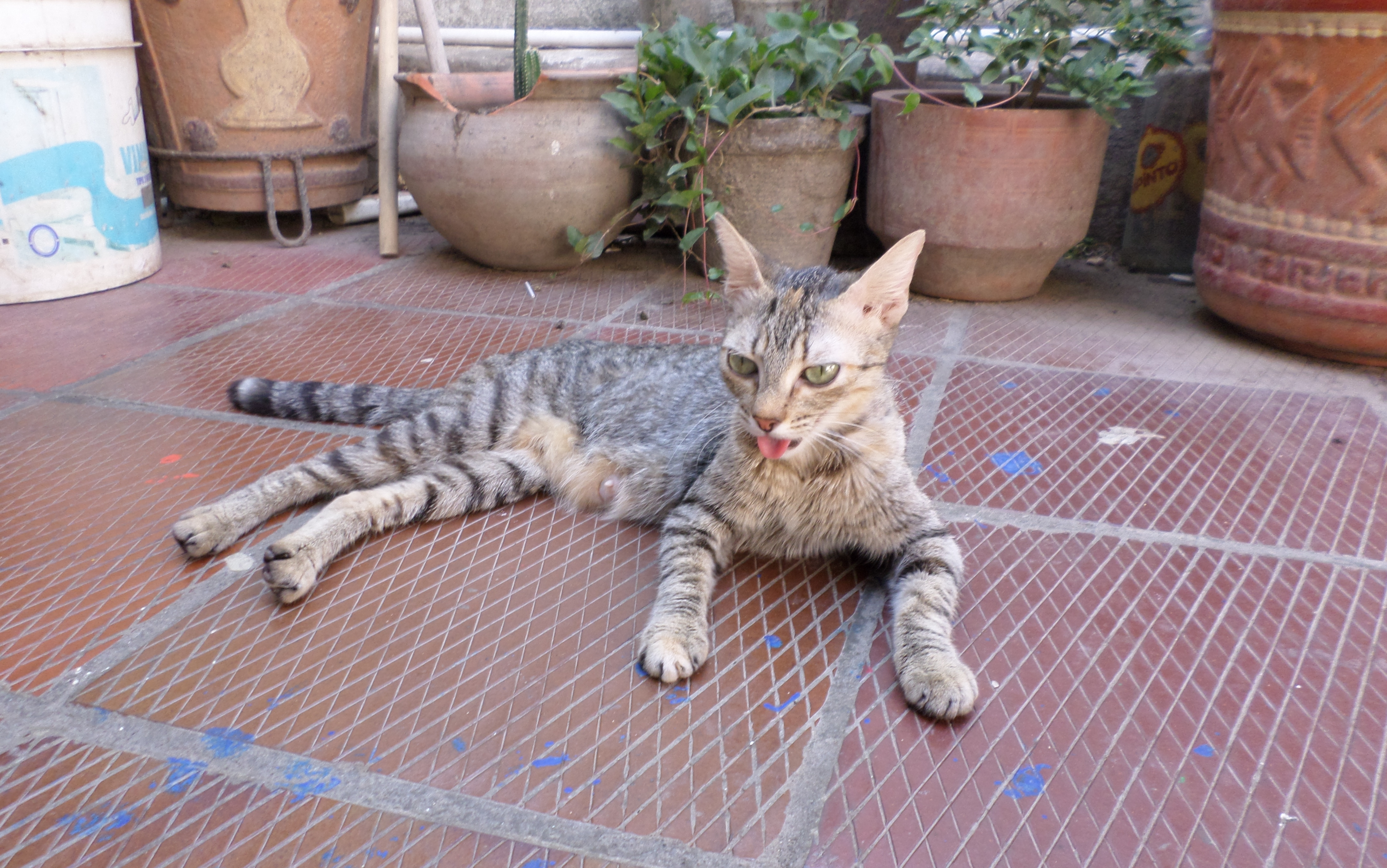
A cat panting

Unlike dogs, panting is a rare occurrence in cats, except in warm weather environments, or after delivery. Some cats may pant in response to anxiety, fear or excitement. It can also be caused by play, exercise, or stress from stimuli, such as car rides. Panting in cat-moms after delivery is normal and not related to temperature, female cats may pant for several days up to weeks postpartum.

However, if panting is excessive or the cat appears in distress, it may be a symptom of a more serious condition, such as a nasal blockage, heartworm disease, head trauma, or drug poisoning. In many cases, feline panting, especially if accompanied by other symptoms, such as coughing or shallow breathing (dyspnea), is considered to be abnormal and is treated as a medical emergency.

== Tactile communication ==
=== Grooming ===
Cat grooming itself

Cats often lick other cats as social grooming or to bond (this grooming is usually done between familiar cats). They also sometimes lick humans, which may indicate affection. Oral grooming for domestic and feral cats is a common behavior. Domestic cats spend about 8% of waking time grooming themselves.

Grooming is extremely important not only to clean themselves but also to control ectoparasites. Fleas tend to be the most common ectoparasite in cats and some studies show indirect evidence that grooming in cats is effective in dislodging fleas from the head and neck. Cats may also use grooming to scratch itchy areas of the body.

=== Kneading ===
Cats sometimes repeatedly tread their front paws on humans or soft objects with a kneading action. This is instinctive to kittens and adults and is presumably derived from the action used to stimulate milk let-down from the mother during nursing. Kittens "knead" the breast while suckling, using the forelimbs one at a time in an alternating pattern to push against the mammary glands to stimulate lactation. Cats have scent glands on the underside of their paws and when they knead or scratch objects or people, it is likely these pheromones are transferred to the person or object being kneaded or scratched.

Cats carry these infantile behaviors beyond nursing and into adulthood. Some cats "nurse", that is, suck on clothing or bedding during kneading. The cat exerts firm downward pressure with its paw, spreading its toes to expose its claws, then curls its toes as it lifts its paw. The process takes place with alternate paws at intervals of one to two seconds. They may knead while sitting on their owner's lap, which may be painful if the cat has sharp claws.

Since most of the preferred "domestic traits" are neotenous or juvenile traits that persist in the adults, kneading may be a relic juvenile behavior retained in adult domestic cats. It may also stimulate the cat and make it feel good, similar to a human stretching. Kneading is often a precursor to sleeping, and many cats purr while kneading, usually taken to indicate contentment and affection. They also purr mostly when newborn, when feeding, or when trying to feed on their mother's teat. The common association between the two behaviors may confirm the evidence in favor of the origin of kneading as a remnant instinct.

=== Bunting ===
Cats sometimes "head-bump" humans or other cats with the front part of the head; this action is referred to as "bunting". This communication might have an olfactory component as there are scent glands in this area of the body, and is possibly for seeking attention when the cat turns its head down or to the side. Some cats also rub their faces on humans as a friendly greeting or indicating affection. This tactile action is combined with olfactory communication as the contact leaves scent around the mouth and cheeks.

Head-bumping and cheek rubbing may be displays of social dominance as they are often exhibited by a dominant cat toward a subordinate.

Touching noses, sometimes referred to as "sniffing noses", is both a sign of affection and a way to mark territory.

=== Biting ===
Gentle biting (often accompanied by purring and kneading) can communicate affection or playfulness, directed at the human owner or another cat. Stronger bites that are often accompanied by hissing or growling usually communicate aggression. When cats mate, the tom bites the scruff of the female's neck as she assumes a lordosis position which communicates that she is receptive to mating.

== Olfactory communication ==
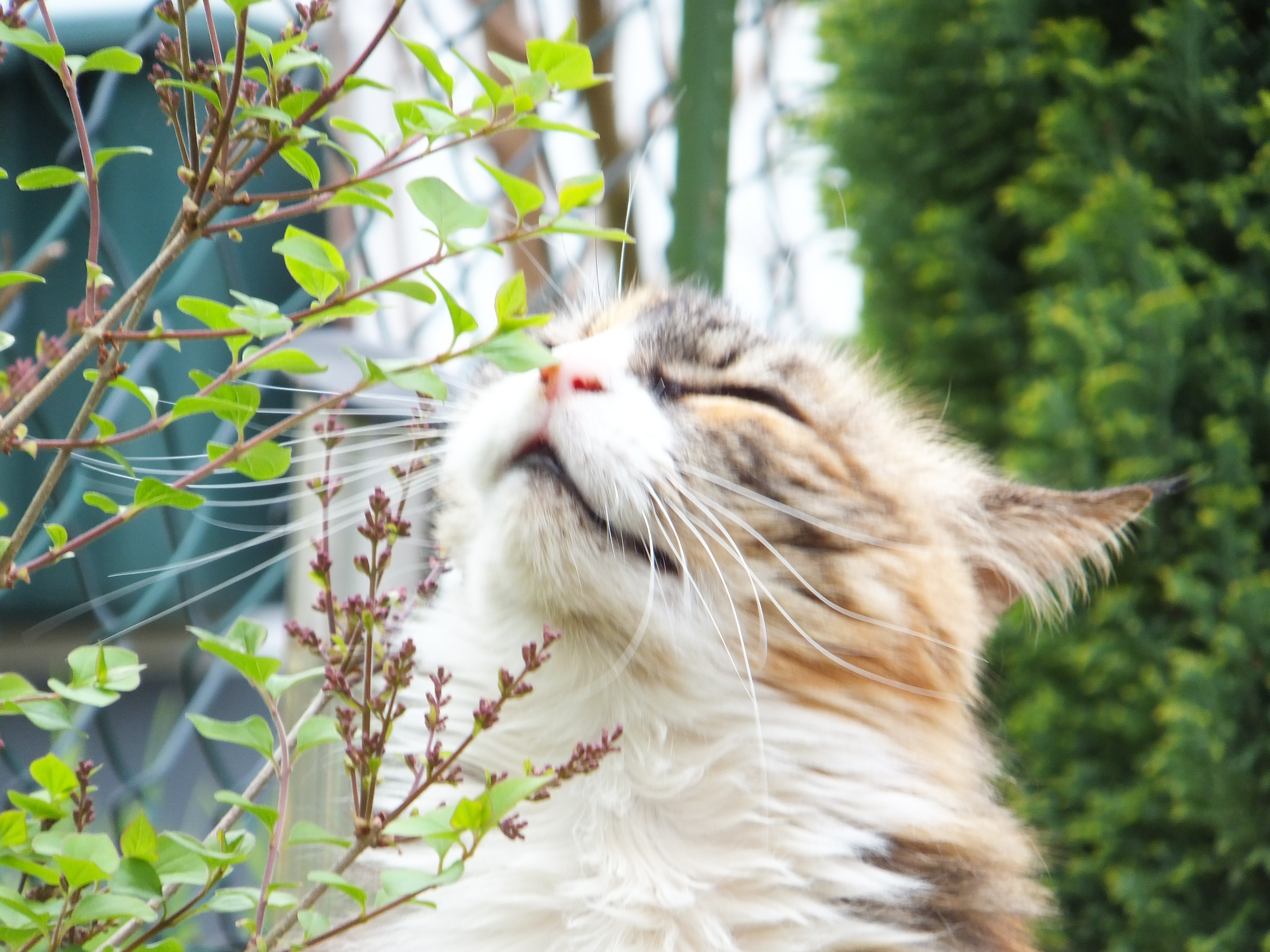
Scent rubbing

Cats communicate through scent using urine, feces, and chemicals or pheromones from glands located around the mouth, chin, forehead, cheeks, lower back, tail and paws. Their rubbing and head-bumping behaviors are methods of depositing these scents on substrates, including humans. The cat rubs its cheeks on prominent objects in the preferred territory, depositing a chemical pheromone produced in glands in the cheeks. This is known as a contentment pheromone. Synthetic versions of the feline facial pheromone are available commercially.

Cats have nine different scent glands in their body. These are the pinna (outer ear flaps), temporal (on their temples), cheek (on the sides of their face), perioral (on the mouth corners), submandibular (under the jaw), interdigital (between toes), anal (on the sides of the anus), caudal (all along tail), and supra-caudal (at the base of tail).

Urine spraying is also a territorial marking. Cats urinate by squatting onto a horizontal surface, while standing up. Unlike a dog's penis, a cat's penis points backward. Although cats may mark with both sprayed and non-sprayed urine, the spray is usually more thick and oily than normally deposited urine, and may contain additional secretions from anal sacs that help the cat make a stronger communication. While cats mark their territory both by rubbing the scent glands, by urine and fecal deposits, spraying seems to be the "loudest" feline olfactory communication. It is most frequently observed in intact male cats in competition with other males. Males neutered in adulthood may still spray after neutering. Female cats also sometimes spray.

A cat that urinates outside the litter box may indicate dissatisfaction with the box, due to a variety of factors such as substrate texture, cleanliness, and privacy. It can also be a sign of urinary tract problems. Male cats on poor diets are susceptible to crystal formation in the urine which can block the urethra and lead to health problems.

The urine of mature male cats in particular contains the amino acid known as felinine which is a precursor to 3-mercapto-3-methylbutan-1-ol (MMB), the sulfur-containing compound that gives cat urine its characteristically strong odor. Felinine is produced in the urine from 3-methylbutanol-cysteinylglycine (3-MBCG) that is excreted peptidase cauxin. It then slowly degrades via bacterial lyase into the more-volatile chemical MMB. Felinine is a possible cat pheromone.

	→
Felinine		MMB

== Socialization ==
Cats, domestic or wild, participate in social behaviors, even though it is thought that most cat species (besides lions) are solitary, non-social animals. These behaviors include socialization between humans and other cats, social learning, and conflicts.

There are 52 measured cat personality traits in cats, with one study showing that five reliable personality factors were found using principal-axis factor-analysis: neuroticism, extroversion, dominance, impulsiveness and agreeableness.

=== Humans ===
Cats between the age of three and nine weeks are sensitive to human socialization. After this period, socialization can be less effective. Studies have shown that the earlier the kitten is handled by people, the less fearful the kitten will be toward people. Other factors that can enhance socialization are having many people handle the kitten frequently, the presence of the mother, and feeding. The presence of the mother is important because cats are observational learners. For example, a mother that is comfortable around humans can reduce anxiety in the kitten and promote the kitten-human relationship.

There are a number of problematic behaviors that affect the human/cat relationship. One behavior is when cats attack people by scratching and biting. This often occurs spontaneously or could be triggered by sudden movements. Another problematic behavior is the "petting-and-biting syndrome", which involves the cat being petted and then suddenly attacking and running away. Other problems are house soiling, scratching furniture, and bringing dead prey into the house. It is these kinds of behaviors that put a strain on the relationship between cats and people.

Feral kittens around two to seven weeks old can be socialized usually within a month of capture. Some species of cats cannot be socialized because of factors such as genetic influence and in some cases specific learning experiences. The best way to get a kitten to socialize is to handle the kitten for many hours a week. The process is made easier if there is another socialized cat present but not necessarily in the same space as the one being socialized. If the handler can get a cat to urinate in the litter tray, then the others in a litter will usually follow. Initial contact with thick gloves is highly recommended until trust is established, usually within the first week. On the other hand, it is a challenge to socialize an adult cat. This is because socialized adult feral cats tend to trust only those who they trusted in their socialization period, and therefore can be very fearful around strangers.

=== Social learning ===
Cats are observational learners. This type of learning emerges early in a cat's life, and has been shown in many laboratory studies. Young kittens learn to hunt from their mothers by observing their techniques when catching prey. The mother ensures their kittens learn hunting techniques by first bringing dead prey to the litter, followed by live prey. With the live prey, she demonstrates the techniques required for successful capture. Prey-catching behavior of kittens improves at higher levels over time when their mothers are present.

Observational learning for cats can be described in terms of the drive to complete the behavior, the cue that initiates the behavior, the response to the cue, and the reward for completing the behavior. This is shown when cats learn predatory behavior from their mothers. The drive is hunger, the cue is the prey, the response is to catch the prey, and the reward is to relieve the hunger sensation.

Kittens also show observational learning when they are socializing with humans. They are more likely to initiate socialization with humans when their mothers are exhibiting non-aggressive and non-defensive behaviors. Even though mothers spend more time with their kittens, male cats play an important role by breaking up fights among littermates.

Observational learning is not limited to kitten-hood – it can also be observed during adulthood. Studies have shown that adult cats that see others performing a task, such as pressing a lever after a visual cue, learn to perform the same task faster than those who did not witness another cat at that task.

=== Dominance ===
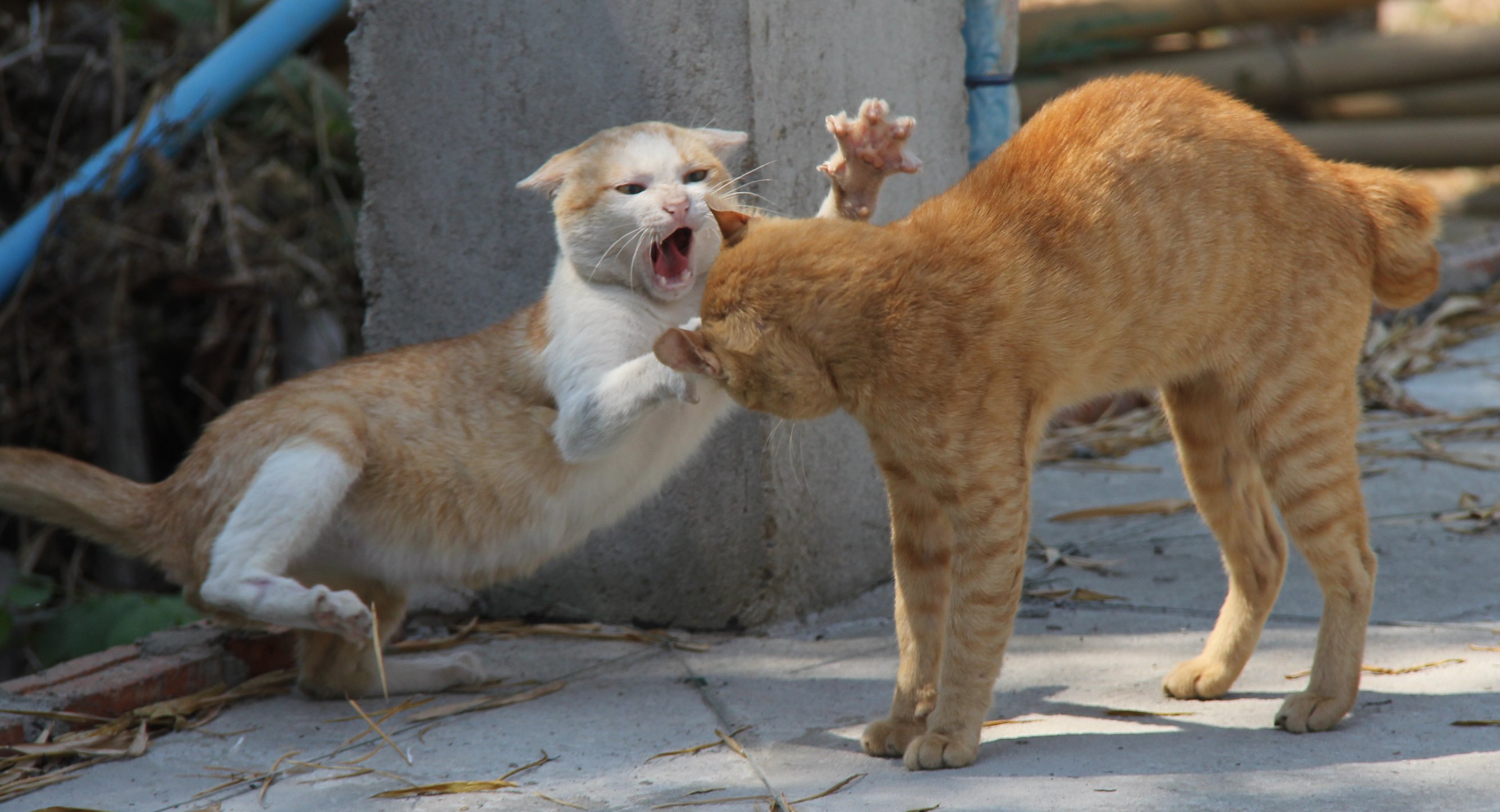
Two cats fighting

A conflict situation of one tomcat meeting another, making loud calls

Domestic cats play-fighting shortly after being introduced to each other

Dominance can be seen among domestic cats in multi-cat households. "Subordinate" cats submit to the "dominant" cat. Dominance includes such behaviors as the submissive cats walking around the dominant cat, waiting for the dominant cat to walk past them, avoiding eye contact, crouching, lying on their side (defensive posture), and retreating when the dominant cat approaches. Dominant cats present a specific body posture as well. The cat displays ears straight up, the base of its tail will be arched, and it looks directly at subordinate cats. These dominant cats are usually not aggressive, but if a subordinate cat blocks the food source they may become aggressive. When this aggressive behavior occurs, it could also lead to the dominant cat preventing subordinate cats from eating and using the litter box. This can cause the subordinate cat to defecate somewhere else and create problems with human interaction.

Usually, when strange cats meet, one of them makes a sudden move that puts the other cat into a defensive mode. The cat will then draw in on itself and prepare to attack if needed. The submissive cat will usually run away before a physical altercation ensues. This is not always the case, and what is known as a "tomcat duel" may follow. Dominance is also seen as an underlying factor that depict how conspecifics interact with each other.

=== Conflict ===
Social conflict among cats depends solely on the behavior of the cats. Some research has shown that cats rarely pick fights, but when they do, it is usually for protecting food and/or litters, and defending their territory. Fights can happen between two females or between a male and a female. Cats may need to be reintroduced or separated to avoid fights in a closed household.

The first sign of an imminent tomcat duel is when both cats draw themselves up high on their legs, all hair along the middle of their backs is raised straight up, and they mew and howl loudly as they approach one another. The steps the cats make become slower and shorter, as they get closer to one another. Once they are close enough to attack, they pause slightly, and then one cat leaps and tries to bite the nape of the other cat. The other cat has no choice but to retaliate and both cats roll aggressively on the ground. During such confrontations, both cats produce loud intense screams. After some time, the cats separate and stand face to face to begin the attack all over again. This can go on for some time until one remains seated, showing defeat. The defeated cat does not move until the victor completes sniffing the area and moves outside the fighting area. Once this happens, the defeated cat leaves the area, ending the fight.

== See also ==
- Animal communication
- Cat pheromone
- Dog communication
