= C8H17NO3S =

The molecular formula C_{8}H_{17}NO_{3}S (molar mass: 207.28 g/mol) may refer to:

- CHES (buffer), a buffering agent
- Felinine, a chemical compound and amino acid found in cat urine
