= Cauxin =

Protein found in cat urine

Cauxin is a carboxylesterase that is excreted in large amounts in cat urine. There is also evidence that it can serve as a peptide hydrolase in the production of cat pheromone precursors. Cauxin has a mass of 70 kilodaltons and is composed of 545 amino acids. The protein can also exist as a multimeric protein complex connected by disulfide bonds with a mass of 300-350 kilodaltons. This is its primary form in non-reducing conditions. The proximal tubules of epithelial cells in the kidney express cauxin. This protein is secreted into the urine from the renal tubular cells. The gene for the protein is also found in several other mammalian genomes in various organs. However, the only mammals that have cauxin present in urine are cats. It is also the first carboxylesterase to be found in urine.

Cauxin has been shown to hydrolyze 3-methylbutanol-cysteinylglycine (3-MBCG) in the urine into felinine which then slowly degrades into the putative, sulfur-containing cat pheromone 3-mercapto-3-methylbutan-1-ol (MMB). This pheromone is used to mark territory with urine.

Neutered male cats have less cauxin in their urine than do intact males. Intact males also have higher levels of cauxin than adult females and kittens. This, in addition to cauxin's role in pheromone production, suggests that it is also involved in sexual signaling.

Cauxin or its homologs are present in many cat species. These homologs are highly conserved and also exist as multimers. However, the cauxin concentrations in urine seems to vary depending on the species with larger species generally having lower concentrations in urine than smaller domestic cats. This is likely a result of decreased reliance on felinine, due to the existence of additional, more complex signaling molecules that are present in the urine of larger cats.

Cauxin is also present in the seminal fluid of cats and several other mammals, including sheep, pigs, cattle, rams, boars, rats, and mice. The cauxin found in seminal fluid is produced by epidydimal cells. The concentration in seminal fluid is much lower than its concentration of urine. The role of cauxin as an esterase allows it to hydrolyze specific monoacylglycerols, suggesting that it is involved in lipid transfer and metabolism. It is also theorized to play a role in fertilization.

Cauxin protein from feline urine was reported in 2008 to act as a nucleator for struvite crystals, in an in vivo system containing magnesium, ammonium, and phosphate ions. Thus, this protein may act as one cause for feline urinary stones.

Decreased cauxin concentration of urine is also a marker of tubulointerstitial nephritis in cats, a common illness in older domestic cats. This is due to damage to the tubular cells where excreted cauxin is produced.

== Chemistry ==
| | → |
| Felinine | MMB |

== See also ==
- Cat pheromone
