= Meow =

Vocalization by cats

Meow

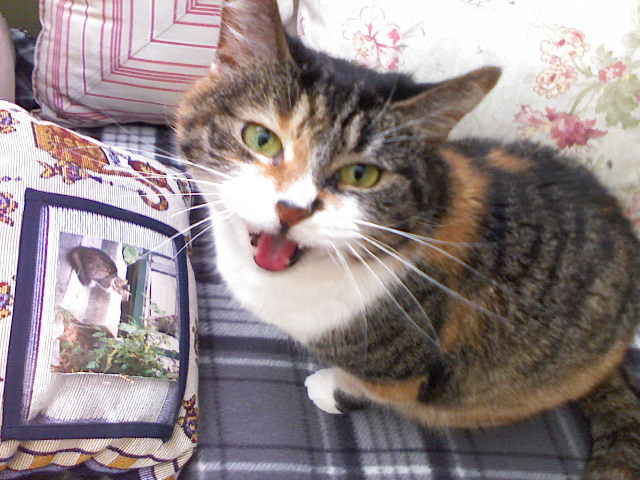
A cat meowing

A meow or miaow is a cat vocalization. Meows may have a large range of sounds. Adult cats rarely meow to each other, and so adult meowing to human beings is generally considered a post-domestication extension of meowing by kittens: a call for attention.

Pre-domesticated felines are believed to have communicated with each other mainly via their sense of smell and marking behaviors which provide a superior means of communication with other cats, but as they were domesticated they learned to vocalize to humans. Their vocalizations can signal hunger, desire to go outside, or simple greetings.

== Types ==
Audio of a cat meowing

The following sounds can be produced when the cat's mouth is first opened and then gradually closed:

- A "mew" is a high-pitched meow often produced by kittens. It is used to solicit attention from the kitten's mother, and adult cats may use it during periods of distress or sadness, or to signal submission.
- A "squeak" is a "mew"-like, raspy, and nasal meow often used in friendly requests to humans.
- A "meow" or "miaow" has the /iaʊ/ sequence of vowels indicated by the onomatopeia "meow", and is often used in cat-human communication to solicit food or help. Adult cats seldom meow to other cats.
- A "trill-meow" is a combination of a chirrup and a miaow, often used in similar contexts
- A "moan" is a meow including /u/ vowels, often indicating distress.
- A "howl" is an extended vocalic sound, often in a repeated sequence, which cats use when threatened.
- A "mating cry" or "caterwaul" is a long sequence of "miaow"-like sounds.

== Background and biological details ==
Meowing fundamentally evolves as a learned behavior. Feral cats meow much less often than domesticated ones. Over time, cats may learn to meow in response to human vocalizations, so that a back and forth resembling a conversation in all but content may take place.

== Etymology ==
The words used to represent meow globally are similar because cats meow the same way globally. However, differences between words emerge with time.

== See also ==
- Cross-linguistic onomatopoeias § Mammal sounds
- Devocalization
- List of animal sounds
