= Felinine =

Names
- IUPAC name (2R)-2-Amino-3-[(3-hydroxy-1,1-dimethylpropyl)thio]propanoic acid

Identifiers
CAS Number	471-09-0
3D model (JSmol)	Interactive image
Beilstein Reference	2250979
ChEBI	CHEBI:39390
ChemSpider	144304
PubChem CID	164607
UNII	8V49J0ABL5
CompTox Dashboard (EPA)	DTXSID10197036
- InChI: InChI=1S/C8H17NO3S/c1-8(2,3-4-10)13-5-6(9)7(11)12/h6,10H,3-5,9H2,1-2H3,(H,11,12)/t6-/m0/s1 Key: IFERABFGYYJODC-LURJTMIESA-N; InChI=1/C8H17NO3S/c1-8(2,3-4-10)13-5-6(9)7(11)12/h6,10H,3-5,9H2,1-2H3,(H,11,12)/t6-/m0/s1 Key: IFERABFGYYJODC-LURJTMIEBQ
- SMILES: O=C(O)[C@@H](N)CSC(CCO)(C)C

Properties
Chemical formula	C_{8}H_{17}NO_{3}S
Molar mass	207.29 g/mol
- Except where otherwise noted, data are given for materials in their standard state (at 25 °C [77 °F], 100 kPa). verify (what is ?) Infobox references

Felinine, also known as (R)-2-amino-3-(4-hydroxy-2-methylbutan-2-ylthio)propanoic acid, is an amino acid found in cat urine and a precursor via microbial lyase of the putative cat pheromone and thiol called 3-mercapto-3-methylbutan-1-ol (MMB). Felinine is excreted by some Felidae species, including bobcats, Chinese desert cats, the kodkod, and domestic cats.

== Biosynthesis ==
Felinine synthesis starts in the liver through a condensation reaction of glutathione and isopentenyl pyrophosphate to form 3-methylbutanolglutathionine (3-MBG). Then, kidney epithelia tissue secretes γ-glutamyl transpeptidase (γ-GTP). γ-GTP converts 3-MBG to 3-methylbutanol-cysteinylglycine (MBCG). Next, a majority of MBCG is hydrolyzed to felinine and glycine by carboxylesterase 5A, or cauxin. Cauxin specifically works by hydrolyzing the dipeptide (felinylglycine) in MBCG to increase the concentration of urinary felinine. The leftover MBCG is converted to felinine and secreted into the cells where it is acetylated and transported to fecal material. Therefore, high concentration of felinine is present in urine while a minor concentration of N-acetylfelinine is present in cat excrement.

1. Glutathione + Isopentenyl Pyrophosphate → 3-MBG
2. 3-MBG + γ-GTP → MBCG
  - MBCG + Cauxin → Felinine + Glycine, or
  - MBCG → N-Acetylfelinine

Urine of domestic cats may contain a series of felinine-containing compounds including free felinine, acetylfelinine, felinylglycine and 3-MBG.

Cysteine also plays a role in the synthesis of felinine. For one, the amino acid is commonly present in many enzymes. Also, it is one of the few precursors for glutathione. Glutathione is converted to 3-MBG, and so cysteine has an important role in the early steps of synthesis.

1. Cysteine + Glycine + Glutamate → Glutathione

== Uses ==
A precursor for mercaptan is 3-mercapto-3-methylbutanol (MMB). MMB is a chemical which gives a strong odor to cat urine. This smell is likely used for communicating amongst cats as well as scaring away predators and rivals. That is, the smell can mark their territory amongst other male cats and attract a female mate.

== Felinine variables ==
Felinine excretion is regulated by levels of testosterone, and so its concentration is dependent on the sex and age of the cat. For instance, cats with high levels of testosterone produce higher levels of 3-MBG. Consequently, non neutered males have significantly higher concentrations of felinine in their urine than females and neutered males. Furthermore, cauxin is a carboxylesterase enzyme which hydrolyzes 3-methylbutanol-cysteinylglycine (MBCG) into felinine. Thus, felinine is dependent upon cauxin, and cauxin is excreted most in male cats above the age of three months. Therefore, older cats, compared to young kittens, have higher concentrations of felinine.

Also, long hair cats have less cysteine to go around as the amino acid is also used for protein structures found in hair. Thus, long-haired cats make less felinine than short-haired cats.

The urea in cat urine has been found to react with the felinine in the urine. After synthetic felinine was incubated in urea, none of it was recovered, suggesting a degradation or modification of felinine. However, evidence suggests that the interaction does not stem from a nucleophilic reaction.

It has been found that dietary supplementation with amino acids other than cysteine impact felinine excretion. This is most likely caused by the presence of arginine, which is believed to inhibit synthesis of MBG, which decreases felinine excretion.

== See also ==
- Cat pheromone
