= Cajeput tree =

Common name for several species of tree

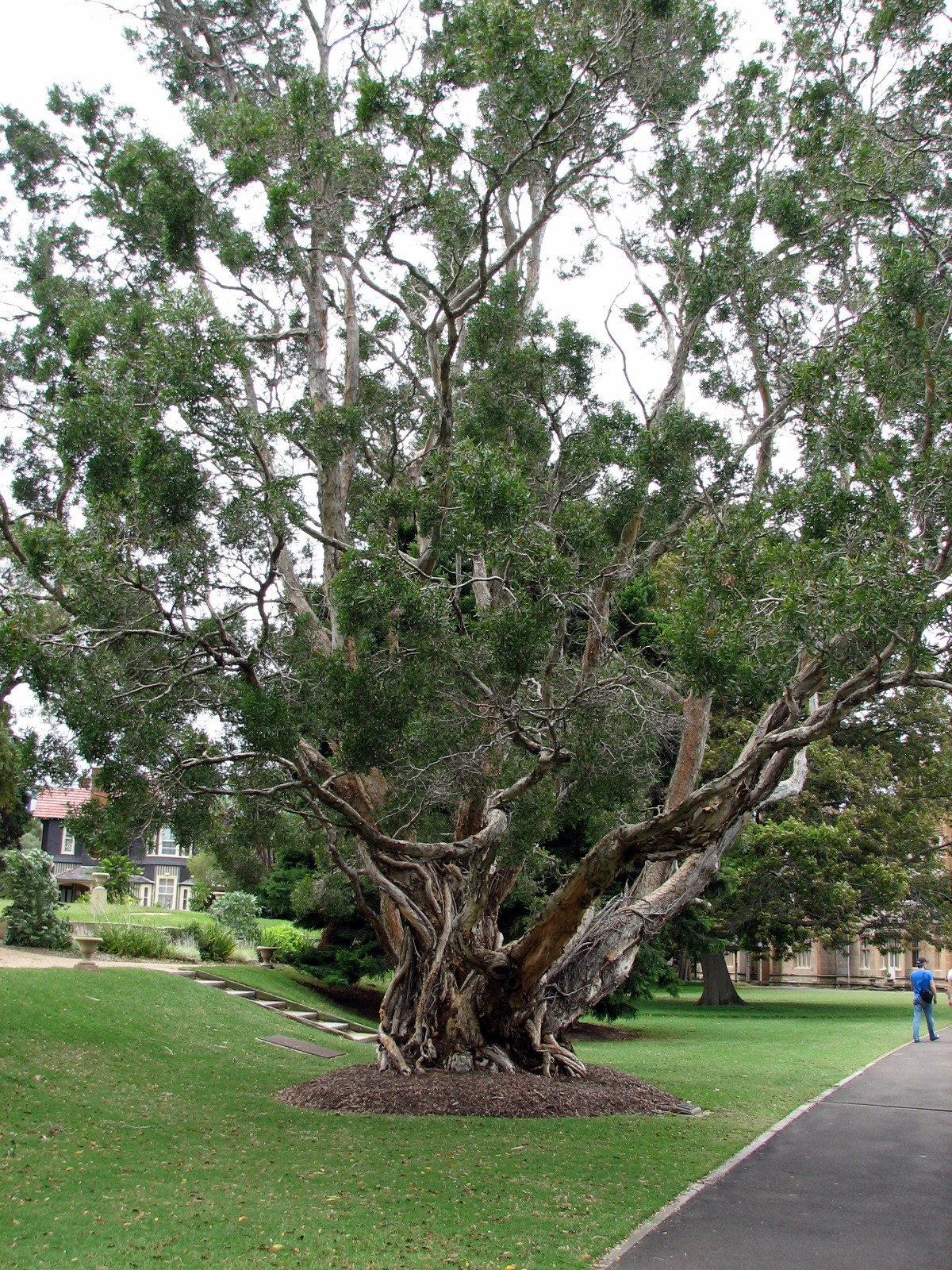
Melaleuca leucadendra

Cajeput tree is a common name used for a certain classification of tree that has a white spongy bark that is flexible and can easily flake off the trunk. The cajeput tree is of the genus Melaleuca, native to Australia and is commonly known in North America as the tea tree. The name 'cajeput tree' is primarily used for the species M. cajuputi, M. leucadendra, M. linariifolia, M. viridiflora and M. quinquenervia. Other names for these trees are the paperbark tree, punk tree, or the white bottlebrush tree. Similar subtropical trees from the eucalyptus family are evergreens with pointed leaves and white, red or green flowers.

== Invasive species in Florida ==
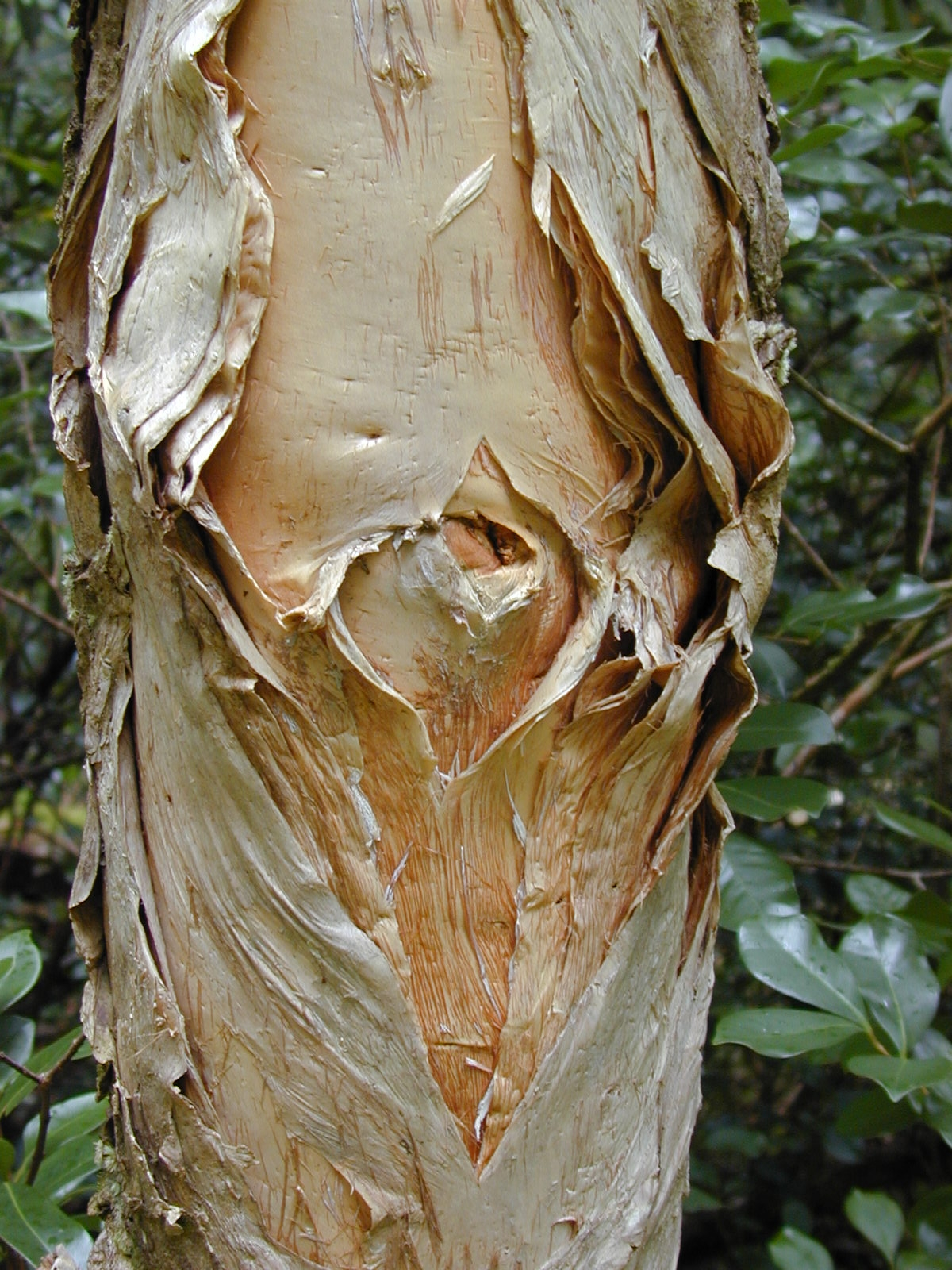
Melaleuca quinquenervia bark

Melaleuca quinquenervia is considered an invasive species in swampy areas of Florida. It was introduced into the United States both as an ornamental tree and to control erosion in swamps.

== Uses of the cajeput tree ==
The various parts of the cajeput tree, specifically Melaleuca leucadendra, have many known uses.

- Its flaky bark can be utilised for weaving. It is also used to caulk boats, making them waterproof. Aborigines of Australia often used the cajeput tree bark for shields, canoes, roofing material and timber.
- Its fruits are used as food seasoning in Southeast Asia, where this species is found locally.
- The cajeput trees are a source of cajeput oil in Southeast Asia, an essential oil that is extracted from the leaves and twigs of the tree. Cajeput oil is primarily used in aromatherapy, as an expectorant, painkiller, antifungal oil and skin mite reducer. The oil is produced by steam distillation of the M. leucadendra and M. quinquenervia species. A similar essential oil known as tea-tree oil is extracted from the species M. alternifolia, a native of Australia. Melaleuca pollen can be an allergen and tea-tree oil may cause allergic reactions for some people. Cajeput trees grown in Australia are well known for having powerful therapeutic properties. Compared to other countries, Australia's cajeput contains high amounts of anti-infectious properties (cineol, pinene and others).

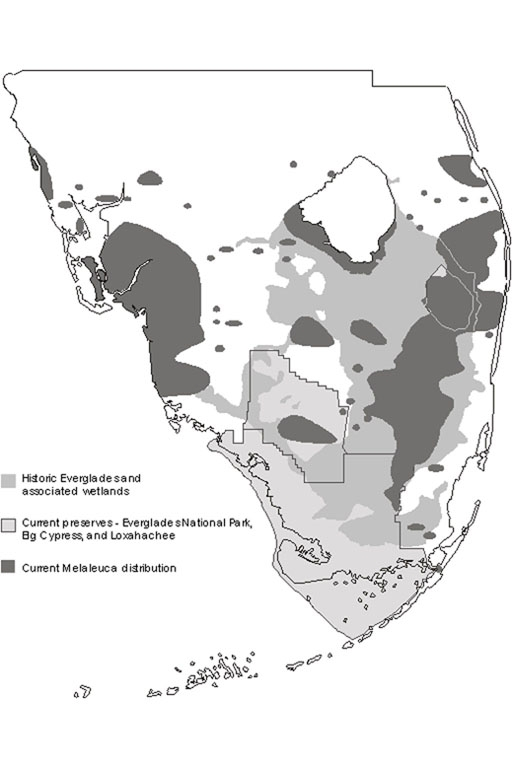
Melaleuca quinquenervia distribution in Florida
