= Melafix =

Aquarium medicine brand by Mars Fishcare

Melafix is a brand of aquarium medicine made by Mars Fishcare, marketed as a natural remedy for bacterial infections, made from cajeput oil.

== Uses ==
Melafix is used by hobby fishkeepers to treat and prevent bacterial fish diseases, including fin rot and cottonmouth disease. It is an option for those who prefer to use natural remedies on their tank. However, among aquarists, its usefulness is debated on the basis of its efficacy and potential harm to anabantoid fish such as Betta splendens.

It is also sometimes used in laboratory settings involving fish. In an effort to improve animal welfare of studied fish, Rácz et al. refined a protocol for the tagging of zebrafish (an important model organism) which includes the use of Melafix as a post-procedure antiseptic.

The product is on the list of approved treatments for fish during mandatory quarantine after being imported to Australia.

== Safety and efficacy ==
A 2015 study on Melafix found it had no antibacterial properties against several common fish pathogens, and suggested that reports of success with the product from hobbyists might point to immunostimulant properties instead. It also concluded that the product had no harmful impact on either goldfish or common clownfish.

Another study the same year tested its efficacy against the common guppy parasite, Gyrodactylus turnbulli. An in vitro experiment found that Melafix, as well as the cajeput oil and an emulsifier used in the product tested separately, were as effective against the parasite as the antihelminthic drug Levamisole. An in vivo experiment found Melafix highly effective against the parasite when used in combination with another product from the company, Pimafix. However, neither product was significantly different than the control on its own.
