= Cajeput oil =

Chemical compound

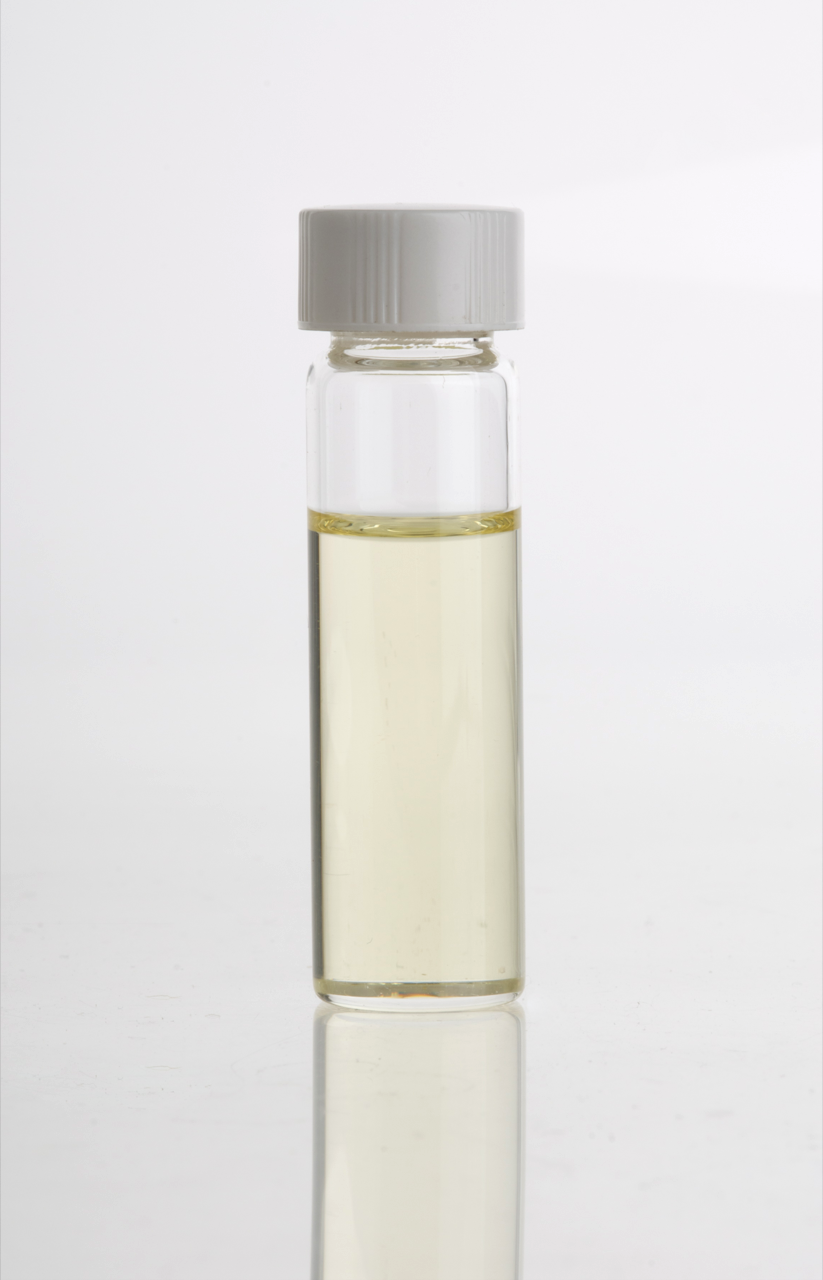
Cajuput essential oil in clear glass vial

Cajuput oil (also spelled cajeput) is a volatile oil obtained by distillation from the leaves of the myrtaceous trees Melaleuca leucadendra, Melaleuca cajuputi, and probably other Melaleuca species. The trees yielding the oil are found throughout Maritime Southeast Asia and over the hotter parts of the Australian continent. The majority of the oil is produced on the Indonesian island of Sulawesi. The name "cajeput" is derived from its Malay name, kayu putih or "white wood".

== Production and uses ==
The oil is prepared from cajeput leaves and twigs macerated in water, and steam distilled after fermenting for a night. The resulting oil is extremely pungent, flammable, and has the odor of a mixture of turpentine, eucalyptus and camphor. It consists mainly of terpenes such as cineol, from which cajuputene, having a hyacinth-like odor, can be obtained by distillation with phosphorus pentoxide. It is a typical volatile oil, and is used internally in doses of 2 to 3 minims, for the same purposes as clove oil.

== Topical uses ==
If successful, pain management using cajeput oil may work by causing surface warmth and irritation through the help of a chemical called cineole, which is employed topically as a counterirritant. It is an ingredient in some liniments for sore muscles, such as Tiger Balm. It is also used as an ingredient in inhalants or decongestants and topical pain remedies. With regard to direct application, cajeput oil can be applied to large areas of skin (after completing a patch test), minor wounds, scratches, and rashes. It also has antibacterial and antifungal activities.

=== Potential side effects ===
Like other essential oils, cajeput oil may cause skin rashes, redness, irritation, burning, and hives when applied directly to the skin in its pure form.

== For fish ==
Cajeput is used for the treatment of bacterial or fungal infections in fish. Common brand names containing Cajeput are Melafix, Pimafix and Bettafix. Melafix is a stronger concentration and Bettafix is a lower concentration that makes it harder to overdose smaller fish, especially bettas. It is most commonly used to promote fin and tissue regrowth, but is also considered effective in treating other conditions, such as fin rot or velvet.

Schivappa et al. tested Melafix and Bettafix on various pathogens including bacteria and found no effect. However Schelkle et al. found high efficacy of Melafix, Pimafix and various ingredients against the helminth Gyrodactylus turnbulli in guppies and in vitro: the emulsifier Crovol, used in both medicines was only useful by itself in vitro.

== See also ==
- Tea tree oil – derived from Melaleuca alternifolia
