= 47th Kerala State Film Awards =

Annual Indian film awards ceremony

- Awarded for: Best of Malayalam Cinema in 2016
- Date: 7 March 2017
- Location: Thiruvananthapuram
- Country: India
- Presented by: Kerala State Chalachitra Academy
- First award: 1969

Highlights
- Most wins: Kaadu Pookkunna Neram (5)
- Website: http://www.keralafilm.com

The 47th Kerala State Film Awards were presented by minister A. K. Balan in Thiruvananthapuram on 7 March 2017. The winners in the fiction category were selected by a jury headed by Odisha director A.K. Bir. The other jury members were Priyanandanan, Sundar Das, Sudevan, script writer P. F. Mathews, actress Shanti Krishna, composer and singer V. T. Murali, sound designer Arun Nambiar, critic Meena T. Pillai, and Kerala Chalachitra Academy secretary Mahesh Panju.

== Winners ==
Most Awards
Number of Awards	Film(s)
5	Guppy, Kaadu Pookkunna Neram
4	Kammatipaadam, Kambhoji

Name of Award	Awardee(s)	Name of Film	Remarks
Best Film	Vidhu Vincent (Director); M.P Vincent (Producer)	Manhole	
Second Best Film	Satheesh Babu Senan (Director); Santhosh Babu Senan (Producer)	Ottayaal paatha	
Best Director	Vidhu Vincent (Director)	Manhole	
Best Film with Popular Appeal and Aesthetic Value	Dileesh Pothan director Aashiq Abu (Producer)	Maheshinte Prathikaaram	
Best Children's Film	Abhijith U.A (Director); Arun Vishwam (Producer)	Kolumittayi	
Best Actor	Vinayakan	Kammatipaadam	
Best Character Actress	Kanchana V. K.	Olappeeppi	
Best Character Actor	Manikandan R. Achari	Kammatipaadam	
Best Actress	Rajisha Vijayan	Anuraga Karikkin Vellam	
Best Child Artist	Chethan Jayalal	Guppy	
Best Child Artist	Janaki Menon	Kochavva Paulo Ayyappa Coelho	
Best Debut Director	Shanavas K Bavakutty	Kismath	
Best Cinematography	M. J. Radhakrishnan	Kaadu Pookkunna Neram	
Best Story	Salim Kumar	Karutha Joothan	
Best Screenplay (Original)	Syam Pushkaran	Maheshinte Prathikaaram	
Best Lyrics	ONV Kurup	Kambhoji	"Nadavathil Thurannila"
Best Music Director	M. Jayachandran	Kambhoji	
Best Background Music	Vishhu Vijay	Guppy	
Best Male Singer	Sooraj Santhosh	Guppy	"Thaniye Mizhigal"
Best Female Singer	K. S. Chithra	Kambhoji	"Nadavathil Thurannila"
Best Dubbing Artist	Vijay Mohan Menon	Oppam	(Male)
Best Dubbing Artist	M Thankammani	Olappeppi	
Best Choreography	Vineeth	Kambhoji	"Chenthar Nermukhi"
Best Costume Designer	Stephy Zaviour	Guppy	
Best Makeup Artist	N. G. Roshan	Naval Enna Jewel	
Best Processing Lab/Colourist	Henroy Messia (Vista vfx)	Kaadu Pookkunna Neram	
Best Film Editor	B. Ajithkumar	Kammatipaadam	
Best Sound Recordist	Jayadevan Chakkadath	Kaadu Pookkunna Neram	Location Sound/Live Sound
Best Sound Recordist	Jayadevan Chakkadath	Kaadu Pookkunna Neram	Sound Design
Best Sound Recordist	Pramod Thomas	Kaadu Pookkunna Neram	Sound Mixing
Best Art Director	Gokuldas N.V, S Nagaraj	Kammatipaadam	
Special Jury Award	K Kaladharan	Ottayal Patha	Acting
Special Mention	E. Santhoshkumar	Aaradi	Story
Special Mention	Surabhi Lakshmi	Minnaminungu	Acting
Special Mention	Girish Gangadharan	Guppy	Cinematography
Best Book on Cinema	Aju K. Narayanan, Cheri Jacob K	Cinema muthal Cinema Varae	
Best Article on Cinema	N. P. Sajeesh	Velutha thirsheelayude Karutha Udalugal	
J. C. Daniel Award	Adoor Gopalakrishnan	—N/a	Lifetime achievement award
