= Appuram =

2024 Indian Malayalam language film

- Directed by: Indu Lakshmi
- Written by: Indu Lakshmi
- Produced by: Indu Lakshmi; Ravi Sreedhar
- Starring: Anagha Ravi; Jagadish; Mini I. G.
- Cinematography: Rakesh Dharan
- Edited by: Appu N. Bhattathiri
- Music by: Bijibal
- Production company: Indus Cinemas
- Release date: 14 December 2024 (festival premiere)
- Running time: 72 minutes
- Country: India
- Language: Malayalam

Appuram also titled as The Other Side is a 2024 Indian Malayalam-language family drama film written and directed by Indu Lakshmi. The film stars Anagha Ravi, Jagadish and Mini I. G. in lead roles. For this film, Indu won the FFSI K R Mohanan Award for Best Debut Director from India at the International Film Festival of Kerala.

== Development ==
Appuram is written and directed by Indu Lakshmi, produced by Indu Lakshmi and her father Ravi Sreedhar under the banner Indus Cinemas, with cinematography by Rakesh Dharan, editing by Appu N. Bhattathiri and music composed by Bijibal. All three also served as the co-producers of the film. The film was shot over nine days on a limited budget in and around Thiruvananthapuram, primarily at a house in Venganoor.

Director Indu Lakshmi said that her filmAppuram was deeply personal and have connections with her own experiences as a woman, particularly the mental harassment and oppression she faced during the production of her debut film Nila (2023). She described Appuram as a way of surviving those experiences.

== Plot ==
The film follows Janaki, a teenage girl who lives with her parents, Venu and Chitra. Chitra experiences psychological distress, and Janaki lives with the constant fear of losing her mother. As her fears become reality, Janaki confronts emotional conflicts and social pressures rooted in traditional beliefs and superstitions. The story explores her struggle to overcome these challenges.

The film was shot using sync sound and is narrated from Janaki's perspective as she struggles to make her voice heard, particularly in her conservative grandparents' household.

== Cast ==
- Anagha Ravi as Janaki
- Jagadish as Venu
- Mini I. G. as Chithra

== Music ==
The film has no songs and features only background music composed by Bijibal.

== Release ==
As part of the competition section of the 29th International Film Festival of Kerala (IFFK), Appuram premiered at the Tagore Theatre on 14 December 2024 and was screened again at Kairali on 16 December and New Theatre (Screen 1) on 18 December. It did not have a theatrical release, and was released directly on the streaming platform ManoramaMAX on 1 January 2026.

== Awards and honours ==
For this film, Indu won the FFSI K R Mohanan Award for Best Debut Director from India at the International Film Festival of Kerala.

The film was selected for screening at the 25th New York Indian Film Festival (NYIFF), where it was screened on 21 June 2025. It also received nominations in three categories: Best Film, Best Actress and the New York Women in Film and Television's Excellence Award for a Woman Filmmaker. The film was also screened at the Bangalore International Film Festival , the Eikhoigi International Imphal Film Festival, the 17th Habitat Film Festival in Delhi and the Women's International Film Festival in Kottarakkara.

In November 2025, it was officially selected for the 43rd edition of the Fajr International Film Festival (FIFF) in Iran.

== Reception ==
Ajmal N. S., writing for Mathrubhumi, notes that the film succeeds in illustrating that the emotion of love transcends beliefs and rituals. Vivek Santhosh of The New Indian Express rated the film 3.5 out of 5 stars, describing it as a poignant tale that challenges superstition.

Gowry Priya J., writing for Asianet News, describes 'Appuram' as an 'emotional hook' crafted by Indu Lakshmi within the 'coming-of-age drama' genre. She also writes that the film addresses regressive beliefs centered around horoscopes, caste, and family prestige, and highlights how, even in this modern world, women themselves continue to adhere to restrictions related to menstrual purity.

In the discussions that arose after it's first screening in IFFK, there was criticism that the story, which proposed a progressive idea, was blocked by the idea of faith. Responding to this, actor Jagadish, who played the main character Venu, said that the film is not against customs or beliefs, but the film speaks against irrational beliefs. The director states that there was no attempt to portray anyone in a negative light, and that the film is about superstition, not faith.
