= Trà Sư Cajuput Forest =

- Rừng tràm Trà Sư (Vietnamese)
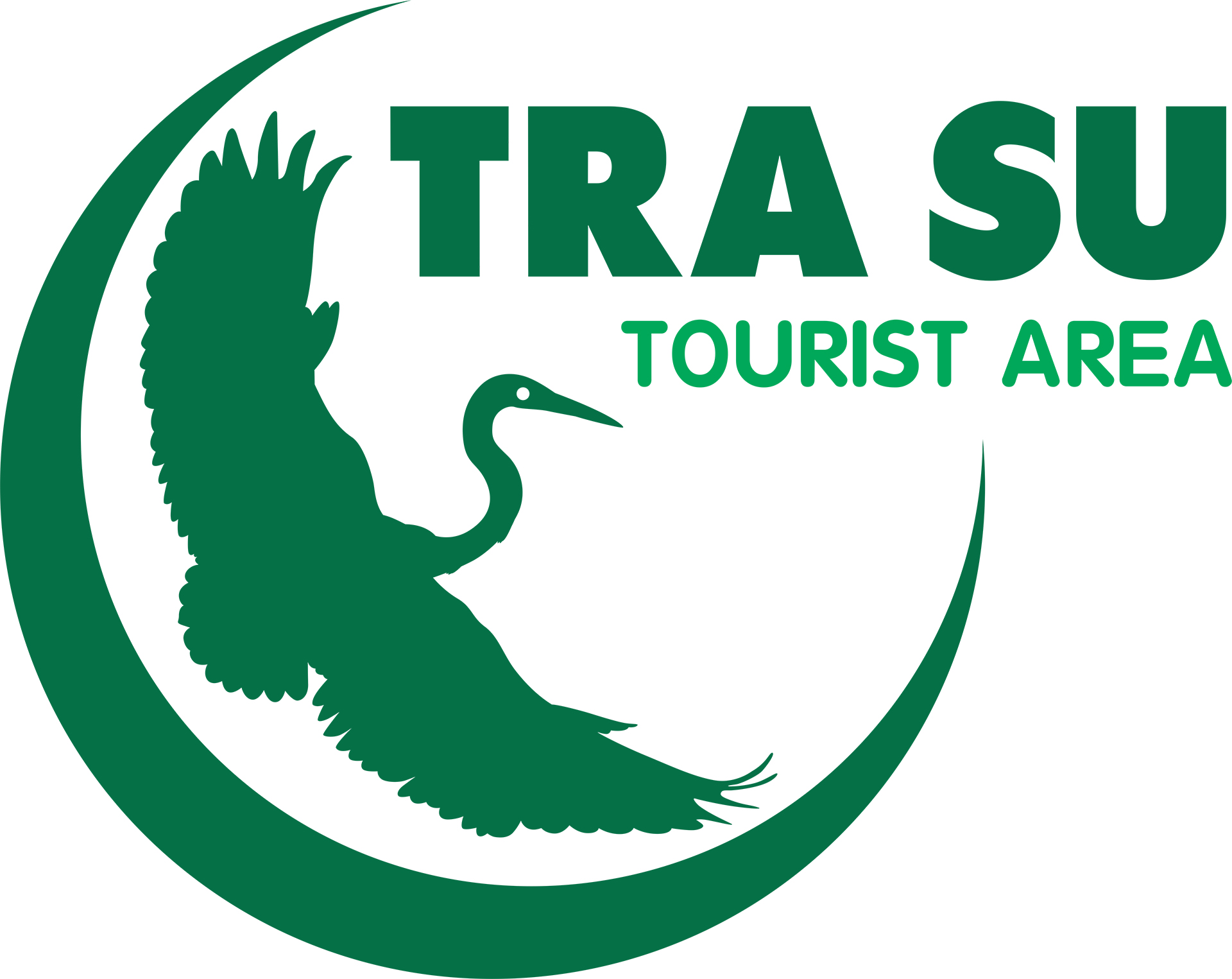
- Interactive map of Trà Sư Cajuput Forest
- Location: Văn Giáo commune, Tịnh Biên district, An Giang province, Vietnam
- Nearest city: Châu Đốc
- Coordinates: 10°35′08″N 105°03′31″E
- Area: 845 ha (2,090 acres)
- Established: 2003
- Website: www.trasu.vn

Trà Sư Cajuput Forest (Vietnamese: Rừng tràm Trà Sư) is a cajuput forest and ecological tourism site located in Văn Giáo commune, Tịnh Biên district, An Giang province, Vietnam. It is a typical flooded forest in the western region of the Hậu River and serves as a habitat for numerous plant and animal species within Vietnam's special-use forest system. The forest is part of the Mekong Delta's wetland ecosystem and has been recognized for its importance in wetland conservation.

== History ==
The forest was planted in 1983 on land heavily affected by acid sulfate soils, using melaleuca trees due to their tolerance to such conditions. The planting aimed to green barren land and mitigate flooding from upstream areas. On May 27, 2003, the An Giang provincial government approved the creation of the Trà Sư Melaleuca Forest Landscape Protection Area to support ecological tourism, environmental research, and conservation.

In 2018, An Giang Tourism Joint Stock Company leased 159 hectares for ecotourism development, and the site officially opened for tourism on August 23, 2018.

== Geography and ecology ==
The forest covers 845 hectares and is located approximately 30 km from Châu Đốc city. It is a representative wetland ecosystem in the Mekong Delta, featuring year-round flooding.

The area boasts rich biodiversity:

- Birds: 70 species from 13 orders and 31 families, including two rare species listed in Vietnam's Red Data Book: the painted stork (Mycteria leucocephala) and the Oriental darter (Anhinga melanogaster).
- Mammals: 11 species from 4 orders and 6 families, including rodents and bats; notable is the rare short-eared fruit bat (Cynopterus sphinx).
- Reptiles and amphibians: 25 species from 2 orders and 10 families.
- Fish: 10 species year-round and 13 during the flood season, including two endangered species: the clown knifefish and the white featherback.
- Plants: 140 species from 52 families, including 78 medicinal plants and various aquatic species like duckweed, water cabbage, lotus, and water lilies.

The forest is particularly vibrant during the flood season from September to November, when water levels rise, enhancing its scenic beauty.

== Tourism ==
Trà Sư is a popular ecological tourism destination. Visitors can explore via motorized boats and canoes, traversing waterways lined with melaleuca trees. Key attractions include the "Ten Thousand Steps Bamboo Bridge," recognized as the longest bamboo bridge in Vietnam at over 10 km, built with over 500,000 bamboo stalks at a cost exceeding 10 billion VND.

The site has been featured in media and visited by celebrities, highlighting its natural beauty and tranquility. It was honored as one of the top attractive tourist destinations in 2024.
