= Nizhal (film) =

2021 film by Appu N. Bhattathiri

- Theatrical release poster
- Directed by: Appu N. Bhattathiri
- Written by: S. Sanjeev
- Produced by: Anto Joseph; Abhijith M. Pillai; Badusha; Fellini T. P. Ginesh Jose
- Starring: Kunchacko Boban; Nayanthara
- Cinematography: Deepak D. Menon
- Edited by: Appu N. Bhattathiri; Arunlal S. P.
- Music by: Sooraj S. Kurup
- Production companies: Anto Joseph Film Company; Melange Film House; Tentpole Movies
- Distributed by: Aan Mega Media
- Release date: 9 April 2021
- Running time: 124 minutes
- Country: India
- Language: Malayalam

Nizhal (pronounced [n̪iɻal]; transl. Shadow) is a 2021 Indian Malayalam-language mystery thriller film directed by Appu N. Bhattathiri (in his directorial debut) and written by S. Sanjeev. It stars Kunchacko Boban and Nayanthara. It also features Izin Hash, Rony David, Saiju Kurup and Divya Prabha in supporting roles. Appu N. Bhattathiri with Arunlal S. P. edited the film while Deepak D. Menon handled the cinematography. Sooraj S. Kurup composed the original songs and background score. The film is produced by Anto Joseph Film Company and Melange Film House in association with Tentpole Movies. Kunchacko Boban plays the role of a first-class Judicial Magistrate for the first time in his career.

In the film, John Baby, who is recovering from a traumatic accident, meets Nitin, a young boy who interests him with murder stories. When John explores the possibility of Nitin's stories by mapping the events, it corresponds with the actual incidents.

== Plot ==
The film starts with John Baby, a magistrate, getting into a car accident in the rain. After being discharged, he is told to temporarily wear a protective face mask until his nose is stable for it to get better. As he resumes his life as a first-class Judicial Magistrate, strange things start to happen as he hallucinates, probably from the accident. On the other hand, his friend Shalini, a child psychologist, approaches him with the case of her patient. Nitin, an eight year old schoolboy, shares with his class a murder story. This strikes Baby's interest and he, along with Shalini visits the boy's mother, Sharmila, in order to talk to the boy. Hostile at first, she lets them as he says that the case should have been reported to the police. The boy appears energetic and normal like any other child. Baby decides to search the place mentioned in the boy's story with the help of the police and finds a human skull submerged in a pond.

Following the investigation, Baby gets close to Nitin and Sharmila. Nitin tells another story, and Baby follows the lead and finds out that it is another actual crime. In order to find the source of these stories, Sharmila, Baby and Nitin travel to the house of a person who kept some case files of her late investigator husband, Sachin. That night, when Baby gets disturbing visions again, he walks to Sharmila and Nitin's room only to discover that it was Sharmila who was telling the boy stories of murder in her sleep. After rushing to share this discovery with Shalini and her husband, Baby reveals this fact to Sharmila after he returns. He questions her about her deceased mother to find any connection, much to her annoyance. They meet Viswanathan, the man who took care of Sharmila after her mother's untimely demise. Vishwanathan faints upon recognising her. At the hospital, he reveals that Sharmila's mother was his love interest; however he did not marry her due to her only being recently widowed. He also confesses that he was the one who had committed the murders in the name of the political party in which he was working, and used to confess to Sharmila's mother while she cradled her baby to sleep, thus transmitting the stories to Sharmila's subconscious mind. Baby decides to get him arrested as soon as he is discharged from the hospital. As Sharmila had to go for a video conference, Nithin went with Baby. Sharmila feels sorry for the elderly Vishwanathan, given how much he seemed to repent and how much time had passed, and so she helps him leave before the cops are called. Upon hearing that he has escaped, Baby is dissuaded from calling for a search, for the aforementioned reason, as well as the fact that the party could target them too. Nithin, having overheard some of the conversation, asks who Radhamma (Sharmila's mother) was. He reveals that he knew the story about Radhamma's death. Realisation hits Baby, and he rushes to Sharmila's house.

In the meantime, Vishwanathan shows up at Sharmila's house and reveals to Sharmila that he was the one who killed her mother. As he found out that both she and her son now know the truth, he needs to get rid of them. He attempts to kill her. Luckily, Baby reaches in time to save her from being strangled, but Viswanathan accidentally loses his footing on the balcony and falls to his death.

Baby is free from his visions, whereas Sharmila has started to hallucinate.

== Cast ==
- Kunchacko Boban as Magistrate John Baby
- Nayanthara as Sharmila (Voice dubbed by Shakthisree Gopalan)
- Izin Hash as Nitin
- Divya Prabha as Dr. Shalini
- Lal as Viswanathan
- Rony David as Rajan
- Prashant Narayanan as Mathiyas Pandian
- Saiju Kurup as CJM Ajith Kumar
- Rajesh Hebbar as Dr. Basheer
- Jolly Chirayath as Vathsala
- Sreelatha Namboothiri as Lisamma, Baby's Mother
- Siyad Yadu as Kaif
- Aadhya Prasad as Megha
- Aina as Catherine
- Vinod Kovoor as Constable Sainudheen
- Aneesh Gopal as Police who spies John Baby
- Shersha Sherief as Police Officer Aftab who helps with swamp case
- Sadiq as Michel
- Renjit Shekar Nair as a bus conductor
- Dixon Poduthas as SP
- Hariprashanth as Commissioner
- Remya Suresh as Bhanu

== Production ==
=== Development ===
Nizhal is the directorial debut of Kerala State Film Award winning editor Appu N. Bhattathiri. The film is financed by five producers, Anto Joseph, Abhijith M. Pillai, Badusha, Fellini T. P. and Ginesh Jose. It is through producer Fellini, the director approached Kunchacko Boban. Boban was finalized for his role at the beginning and he suggested Nayanthara to play the female lead. After reading the script, Nayanthara was impressed and signed the project.

=== Filming ===
The principal photography of the film began on 19 October 2020 at Kalamassery following the COVID-19 protocols. The filming continued at various locations of Ernakulam and Alappuzha districts. The first schedule was completed on 4 December 2020. After wrapping up its Kerala schedule, the team headed to Karnataka for its second schedule and continued filming at Bangalore and Hogenakkal.

== Release ==
The film was released on 9 April 2021.

== Reception ==
Baradwaj Rangan of Film Companion South wrote "Kunchacko Boban and Nayanthara are in fine form but Nizhal is another example of how stars alone cannot make a movie."

The Indian Express gave the film 2 out of 5 writing "There are a few glaring logical holes in the narration that cannot be discussed without spoiling the suspense. The tone of the movie dull as the story fails to live up to the suspense created by the visuals. The script is so weak that it doesn't demand a lot from the actors. While cinematographer Deepak D. Menon's frames move around, the characters remain mostly stationary. For some time it adds to the suspense but as the movie progresses, it sort of becomes repetitive. Especially, Nayanthara remains a pretty face on the screen; an expensive cosmetic addition to the cast. She hardly tries to mimic the nightmarish feeling of a single mother, whose boy is trapped in some kind of a mysterious tangle."

The Times of India gave the film 3 out of 5 writing "The background score by Sooraj S. Kurup is an interesting aspect of this movie. It is fresh and innovative and blends well with the core of the movie. One instance where he uses the boy's words as background score lifts the entire atmosphere. The well-edited movie has some delightful shots by cinematographer Deepak D. Menon. Go for it if you are a fan of stories involving mind-games."

Firstpost gave the film 2.75 writing "It's a pity that Nizhal’s unusual premise wrestles with so many scripting flaws because the atmospherics in the narrative are on the ball and the mystery remains engaging till the finale. Oh well..."

The Hindu gave the film a negative review writing "Managing to build up the anticipation and to keep the audience guessing until the time of the scriptwriter's choosing would mean half the job done in constructing an effective thriller. But much of the other half rests on how potent that final reveal is. Imagine the feeling when you expect a lion to walk out of a cave, after listening to its majestic roars for some time... and you see a mouse crawling out instead! In Nizhal, in the end, after much anticipation, we get to see something much better than a mouse, but something less than a lion too."

Sify gave the film 3/5 writing "Nizhal has its moments for sure but one gets the feeling that it could have been much more with better writing. Having said that, this one is a fine one-time watch."

The Free Press Journal gave the film 3 out of 5 writing "In all, Nizhal certainly scores due to its fresh and novel plot involving a talented kid, but it doesn't deliver more than a decent watch that can surely be seen as a promising directorial debut with controlled expectations."

The New Indian Express gave the film a negative review writing "There is no doubt about Aneesh's comic abilities, but his inclusion felt forced. I wasn't blown away by the final twist either. After the film ended, I asked myself, “That's it?”
