= Vidhu Vincent =

Indian film director

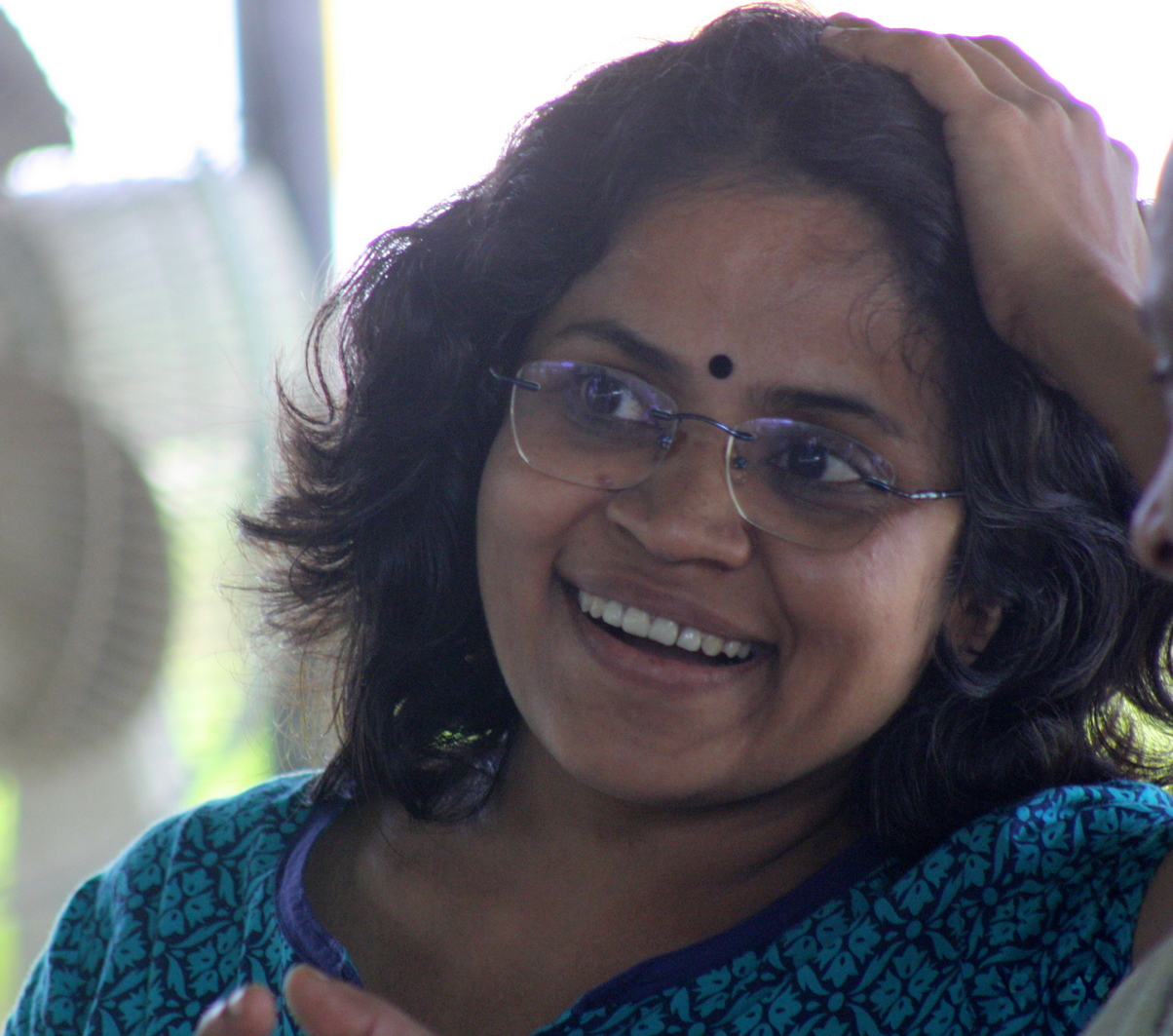
- Born: Vidhu Vincent; Kollam, Kerala, India
- Occupations: Film maker; television journalist; writer
- Children: 1

Vidhu Vincent is an Indian film director, writer, journalist and theatre activist from Kerala. She made her feature film debut with the Malayalam film Manhole, which won her that year's Kerala State Film Award for Best Director. At the 21st International Film Festival of Kerala, the film won two awards including the Best Debutant Director Award for Vincent.

== Biography ==
Born in Kollam, After studying in Government College for Women, Thiruvananthapuram Vincent started her career as a television journalist with Asianet. During her stint with the channel, she was attracted towards documentaries and filmmaking which led to her eventually joining the Centre for Development of Imaging Technology, Thiruvananthapuram. Her reporting about Sand mining in Kerala, Endosulfan victims in Kasaragod and attack on women had generated widespread discussion in the Kerala Legislative Assembly and among general public in the State. She was a reporter with Asianet News when Muthanga incident took place in 2003, and she left her job and joined the movement. She was later arrested by the police for participating in Muthanga agitations. She took a break from her career to pursue degrees in Master of Social Work and Master of Arts (philosophy) before joining to daily journalism with a long reporting essay on "Society and Insurgency in Manipur, India" in 2014.

In 2010, Vincent became the first President of Penkoottu, an organization which highlights the plight of women employees in the unorganized sector. In 2017, she took a leadership role in the formation of Women in Cinema Collective as a response to the violence against female artist and workers in the Malayalam film industry.

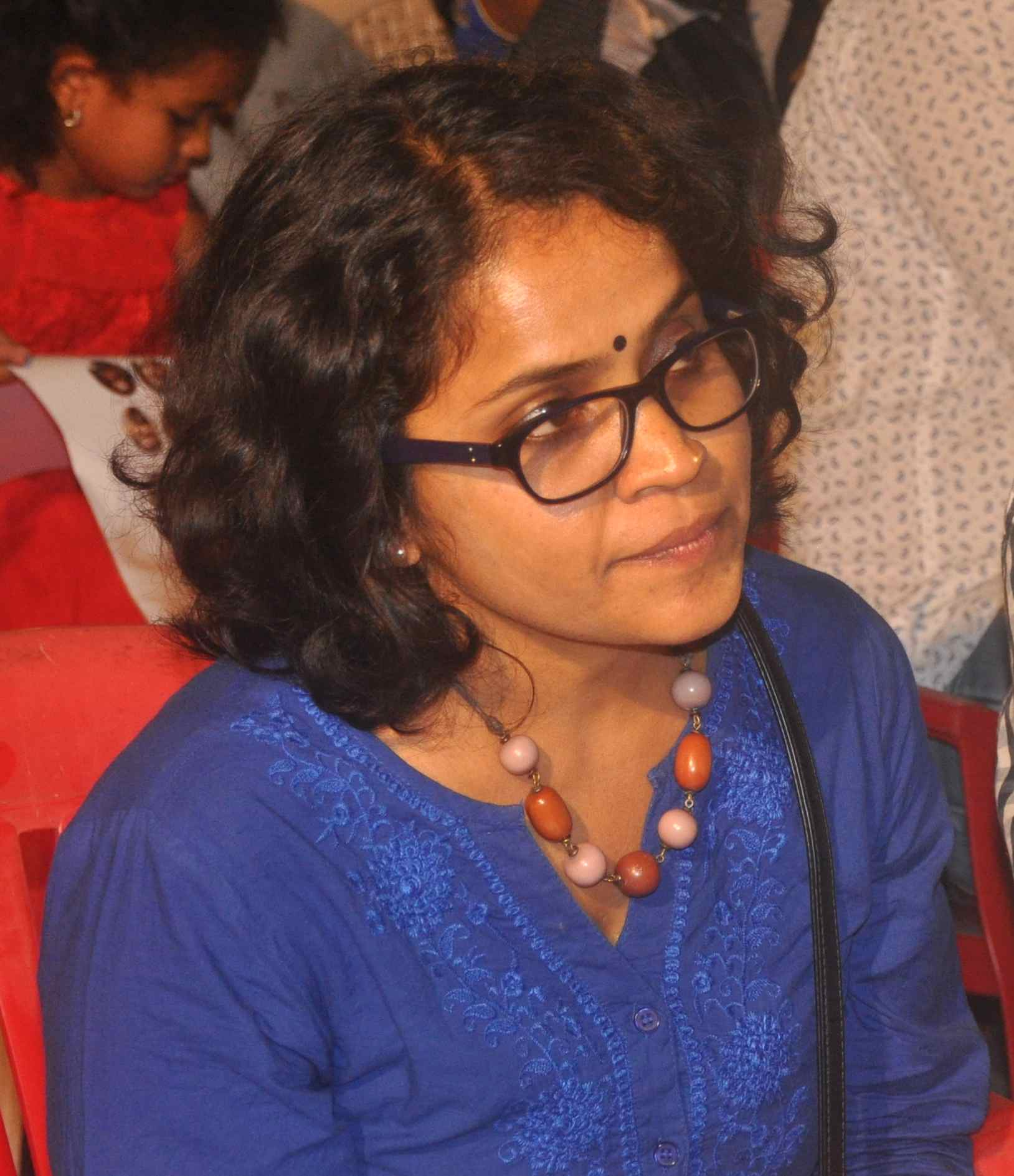
Vidhu Vincent, 2017

Vincent has made a telefilm, Nadakaanthyam, in 2015 for MediaOne TV. The story was based on the life of a theatre actor and his struggle to meet the end in everyday life. The short film won four major awards in the Kerala State Television Awards including Best Direction, Screenplay and the Best short film for the year 2015.

Vincent published a travelogue based on her travel to Germany in a graphic series on Nazism in a Malayalam weekly. The critically acclaimed series published in book form by Chintha Publishers titled Daivam Olivil Poya Naalukal. In 2014, she made a documentary, Vrithiyude Jathi (2014) (transl. Caste and Cleanliness) for Media One. It highlights the plight of manual scavengers in Kerala. Inspired by true incidents, the film is based on the lives of scavengers who live in a neighbourhood of Kollam. Vincent adapted her award-winning documentary into a feature film by making her directorial debut with Manhole. The film entered the "International competition" section of the 21st International Film Festival of Kerala. Vincent became the first woman from Kerala to have a film screened in the history of the festival. At the festival, the film won two awards – the FIPRESCI Award for Best Malayalam Film and the "Silver Crow Pheasant Award" (Best Debutant Director) for Vincent. The film received the John Abraham award (special mention), which is instituted by the Kerala chapter of the Federation of Film Societies of India. In 2017, Vincent was bestowed upon with the Best Director Award at the 47th Kerala State Film Awards, and became the first woman to win a State Award in the category. She received the 2020 Kerala Sahitya Akademi Award for Travelogue for her work Daivam Olivil Poya Naalukal.

== Filmography ==
Year	Film	Notes	Ref.
2014	Vrithiyude Jathi	Documentary film	
2015	After the End of Drama	Short film Kerala State Television and Journalism Award for Best Director and Best Script Writer	
2016	Manhole	Kerala State Film Award for Best Film; Kerala State Film Award for Best Director; Best Debut Director, IFFK; FIPRESCI award for Best Malayalam Cinema, IFFK	
2019	Stand Up	Feature Film	
2020	Singers of Liberation	Short film	
2020	The Rebirth of a River	Documentary film	
2021	Viral Sebi	Feature Film	

== See also ==
- List of female film and television directors
