= Appu N. Bhattathiri =

Indian film editor

- Years active: 2012–present
- Spouse: Abha Varadaraj

Appu N. Bhattathiri is an Indian film director and film editor who predominantly works in Malayalam film industry. He won the Kerala State Film Award for Best Editor for the films Ottamuri Velicham and Veeram in 2017. Three other films he has edited— Oraalppokkam, Ozhivudivasathe Kali, and Manhole—have won Kerala State awards in various categories.

Appu made his directorial debut in 2021 with Nizhal (2021 film).

== Biography ==
Career

Appu earned a BA (Hons) in Visual Effects from Image College of Arts, Animation, and Technology, Chennai, in 2011. During his undergraduate days, he was associated with Jayaraj on Of the People film. During this time, he became acquainted with assistant director Srinath Rajendran. Srinath chose Appu as assistant editor for his debut directorial film, Second Show.

== Filmography ==
Year	Title	Language	Notes	Ref.
2008	Of the People	Malayalam	Uncredited	
2012	Second Show	Malayalam	Assistant editor	
2014	Oraalppokkam	Malayalam		
2015	Kunjiramayanam	Malayalam		
2015	Ozhivudivasathe Kali	Malayalam		
2016	Manhole	Malayalam		
2016	Veeram	Malayalam		
2017	Ottamuri Velicham	Malayalam		
2018	Lilli	Malayalam		
2018	Udalaazham	Malayalam		
2018	Theevandi	Malayalam		
2018	Dakini	Malayalam		
2021	Nizhal	Malayalam	Directorial debut	
2023	Rani: The Real Story	Malayalam		
2024	Aanandhapuram Diaries	Malayalam		
2025	Theatre	Malayalam		

== Personal ==
Appu married Abha Varadaraj in April 2024.
