= Manhole (2016 film) =

- Directed by: Vidhu Vincent
- Written by: Umesh Omanakuttan
- Produced by: M. P. Vincent
- Starring: Munshi Baiju; Renu Sounder
- Cinematography: Saji Kumar
- Edited by: Appu Bhattathiri
- Music by: Sidhartha Pradeep
- Release date: 11 December 2016 (International Film Festival of Kerala)
- Country: India
- Language: Malayalam

Manhole is a 2016 Indian Malayalam-language film directed by Vidhu Vincent, depicting the life and struggles of a manual scavenger's daughter. The film was adjudged the Best Film of the year 2016 by the jury for the Kerala State Film Awards 2016 and the director of the film was selected as the Best Director of the year 2016. This made Vidhu Vincent the first woman to win the Best Director Award in the history of Kerala State Film Awards since its inception in 1969. According to jury chairman Apurba Kishore Bir, Manhole was the unanimous choice among the jury members for convincingly bringing the plight of the marginalised on screen.

The film was also chosen as one of the only two Malayalam films in the competition category of the International Film Festival of Kerala (IFFK) 2016. This has made Vidhu Vincent the first woman director to enter the competition section in the twenty-year history of IFFK. Manhole is the first feature film directed by Vidhu Vincent. The film also grabbed the FIPRESCI : Best Malayalam Film Award during the IFFK 2016. The film was selected for the award "for the raw reality with which the film sheds light on the persistent inhumanity of manual scavengers in India, despite its being legally banned, in a cinematically eloquent manner."

== Synopsis ==
Shalini (played by Renu Soundar) is the daughter of Ayya Swami (played by Ravi Kumar), a manual scavenger, and Pappathi (played by Shaylaja J) who is a housemaid. She tries to hide her caste identity to avoid social exclusion among her friends in the school. She tries to pressure her father to give up the work he is doing, but fails as his vocational options are circumscribed by his caste background. Her father's death in an accident while he was working in the manhole reveals her identity to her friends. She finds it hard to face social antipathy and stigma towards her because of her family's social and caste background. After the death of her father, the burden of running the family falls on her mother. Shalini also starts to work in the local super market as a shop floor assistant. She manages to pass the entrance exam to do a graduate course in Law. Her friend Marimuth, also engaged in manual scavenging to support his studies, faces the same fate as her father while doing his final year. It shakes her faith in the course she has followed in life and she decides to fight against the no exit situation in which those engaged in scavenging are caught in.

== Crew ==
The story and screenplay of the film was by Umesh Omanakuttan. The cinematographer was Saji Kumar, the editor Appu Bhattathiri, sound designer Faizal Ahamed. The film was produced by Vincent MP. The art director was Ajith Plakkadu and the music director was Sidhartha Pradeep.

== Cast ==
Sl. No.	Character	Played by
1	Murugan	Munshi Baiju
2	Government Lawyer	Saji T S
3	Pappathi	Shylaja J
4	Activist Lawyer	Sunnykutty Abraham
5	Ayyan	Ravi Kumar
6	Government Officer	I R Prasad
7	Shalini	Renu Sounder
8	Commission	Gouri Dasan
9	Witness in the Commission	Sunder Raj
10	Mini	Mini M R Kanavu
11	Marimuthu	Suni R S

== See also ==
- 47th Kerala State Film Awards
