= Gyrodactylus turnbulli =

Scientific classification
- Kingdom: Animalia
- Phylum: Platyhelminthes
- Class: Monogenea
- Order: Gyrodactylidea
- Family: Gyrodactylidae
- Genus: Gyrodactylus
- Species: G. turnbulli

Binomial name
- Gyrodactylus turnbulli Harris, 1986

Species of flatworm

Gyrodactylus turnbulli is an ectoparasite from the class Monogenea, is part of the phylum Platyhelminthes, and from the genus Gyrodactylus. It only requires one host to transmit an infection; however, since this parasite lacks oncomiracidium, it must rely on either the adult or subadult for spread of infection (Roberts and Schmidt, 2009). Found in freshwater, this flatworm is commonly found on the gills and fins of the guppy, Poecilia reticulata. G. turnbulli was said to be host specific, but an experiment where parasitologists artificially infected guppies suggests that the parasite can infect a wider range of species. This ability is achievable by host switching, which promotes speciation.

== Etymology ==
The specific name turnbulli honours parasitologist Eleanor Rae Turnbull "who first described gyrodactylids from guppies".

== Morphology ==
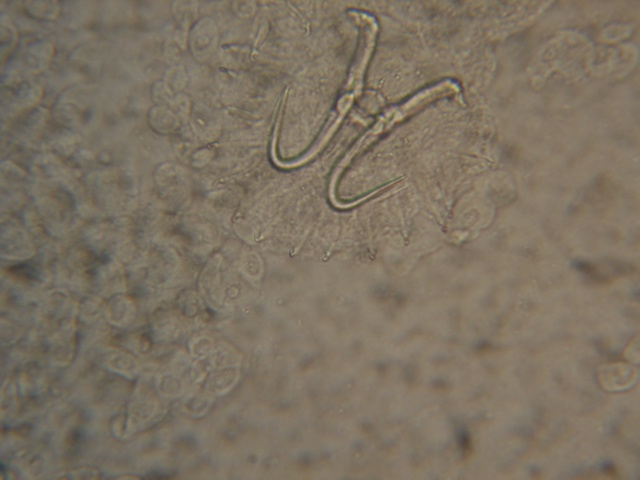
Posterior end of a Gyrodactylus sp., showing the hamuli used to attach to the host.

This monogenean can measure up to 2 mm in length. It has two seminal vesicles, large vitelline follicles, and anchors called hamuli. The hamuli are attached to an opistohaptor located on the dorsal side the flatworm, which is used to latch onto guppies. Attachment to the fish allows G. turnbulli to feed on the gills using its prohaptor, which is located on the anterior end. These parasites are hermaphroditic and viviparous, with a fully grown embryo existing in the utero.

== Life cycle ==
Gyrodactylus turnbulli has a direct life cycle, meaning they can reproduce without an intermediate host. They have an egg cell formation region (ECFR) in replacement for an ovary, where eggs and sperm are stored. This is also the location where embryos develop. Each juvenile worm contains multiple generations of the parasite, which can be described as a "Russian doll". After a worm is born, that worm contains the next generation worm, and that next generation worm holds the following generation. Once the final juvenile worm has been born, the egg in the ECFR is fertilized to continue reproducing Gyrodactylus worms. High water temperature increases the maturation rate to a few days, but low water temperature can delay maturation rate for up to five or six months.

== Transmission ==
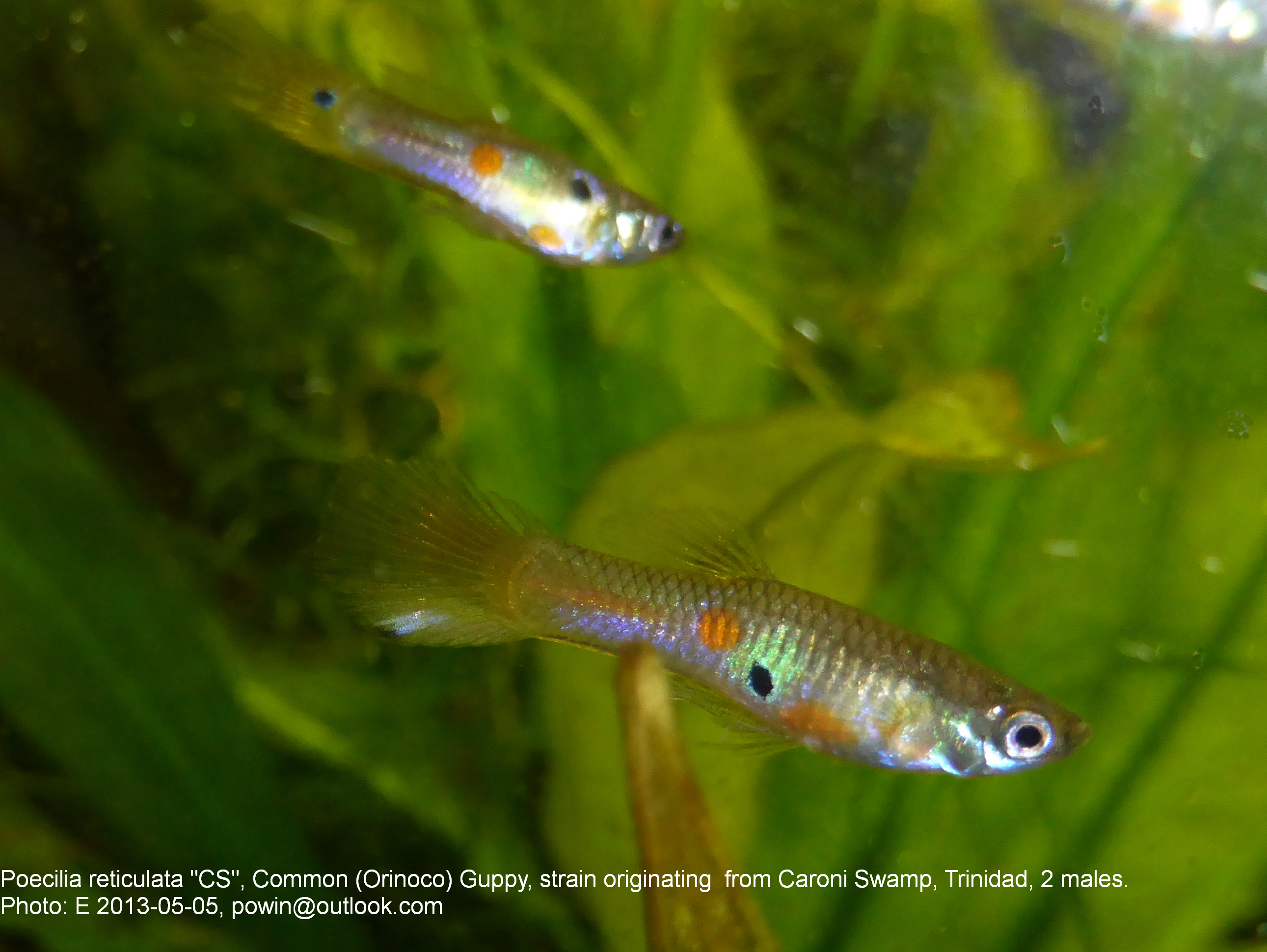
Guppy (Poecilia reticulata), the host of Gyrodactylus turnbulli.

After the juvenile worm has matured to an adult/subadult transmission can occur, but only if the host is in close proximity. Successful infection causes poeciliids to swim erratically; it also causes their dorsal fin to become flattened. If there is no host close enough for the parasite to be transmitted, G. turnbulli rests on the water’s surface. Once guppies begin to feed on the surface, the flatworm can attach to the host. While the parasite feeds, the fish’s fins contract and eventually die. After death of the host, the parasite can easily leave the host, wait at the surface, and continue to infect poeciliids that are nearby.

== Diagnosis ==
Gyrodactylus turnbulli infection can be diagnosed by performing a biopsy. Surgical removal of the parasite would be needed if it is detected on the fish.

== Treatment ==
Most possible treatments to rid of the infection are not approved by the FDA. For example, praziquantel—a common drug used to cure most parasitic infections—can irritate fish gills and cause death. Monogeneans also have the ability to survive praziquantel treatment because they can be protected by mucus that the fish produces. Hydrogen peroxide (300–560 mg/L) can also cure infection, but is not recommended because poeciliids cannot handle a high dosage. Formalin, a solution that is approved by the FDA, can be used to treat freshwater fish; however, it removes a large amount of oxygen from water. As a result, high aeration must be added in conjunction with formalin.

== Prevention ==
Infection of Poecilia reticulata by Gyrodactylus turnbulli can be prevented by dipping the freshwater fish in salt water, since the ectoparasite rests in rivers and streams. Stress hormones are also a contributing factor for G. turnbulli infection, for these hormones inhibit the poeciliid’s immune response, and promote monogenean reproduction.

== Sources ==
- Reed, Peggy, Ruth Francis-Flloyd, Ruth Ellen Klinger, and Denise Petty. "Monogenean Parasites of Fish." EDIS. University of Florida, June 1996. Web.
- Cable, J.; Scott, E. C G.; Tinsley, R. C.; Harris, P. D. (2002). "Behavior favoring transmission in the viviparous monogenean Gyrodactylus turnbulli". Journal of Parasitology. 88 (1): 183–184. doi:10.1645/0022-3395(2002)088[0183:BFTITV]2.0.CO;2.
- Roberts, Larry S., John Janovy, Jr., and Gerald D. Schmidt. "Monogenoidea." Gerald D. Schmidt & Larry S. Roberts' Foundations of Parasitology. 8th ed. New York: McGraw-Hill Higher Education, 2009. 305-06. Print
