= Fin rot =

Disease of fish

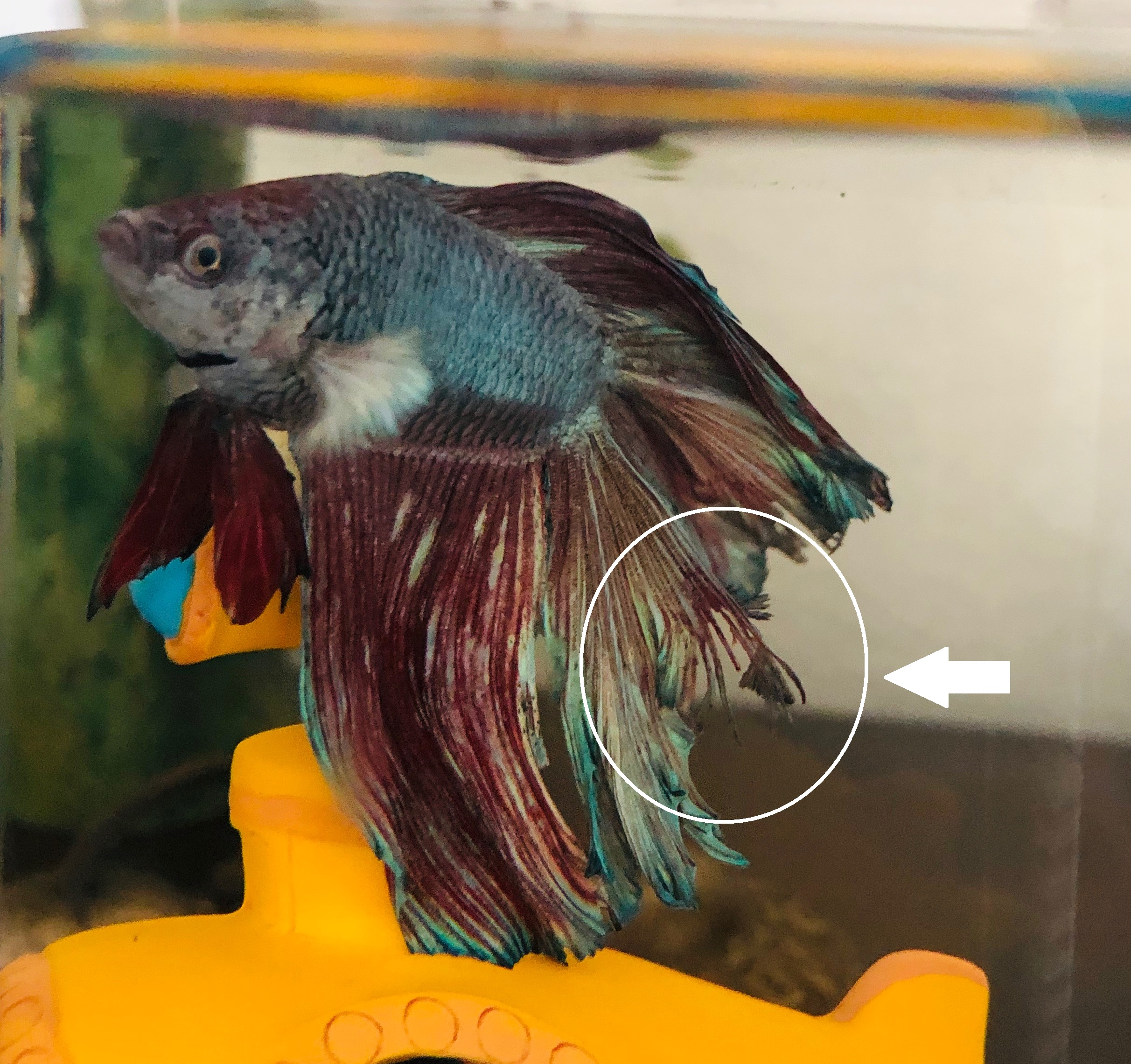
Example of fins fraying on a male betta fish.

Fin rot is the phenomenon where the fins of a fish gradually decay and are eventually destroyed. Typically, fin rot is either a symptom of a disease, oftentimes a bacterial or fungal infection, but it can also sometimes be a disease by itself. Fin rot is most often observed in aquaria and aquaculture, but can also occur in natural populations.

Fin rot can be the result of a bacterial infection (Pseudomonas fluorescens, which causes a ragged rotting of the fin), or as a fungal infection (which rots the fin more evenly and is more likely to produce a white "edge"). Sometimes, both types of infection are seen together. Infection is commonly brought on by bad water conditions, injury, poor diet, stress, or as a secondary infection in a fish which is already stressed by other disease.

Fin rot starts at the edge of the fins, and destroys more and more tissue until it reaches the fin base. If it does reach the fin base, the fish will never be able to regenerate the lost tissue. At this point, the disease may begin to attack the fish's body; this is called advanced fin and body rot.

Fin rot is common in bettas due to poor water conditions in pet stores.
