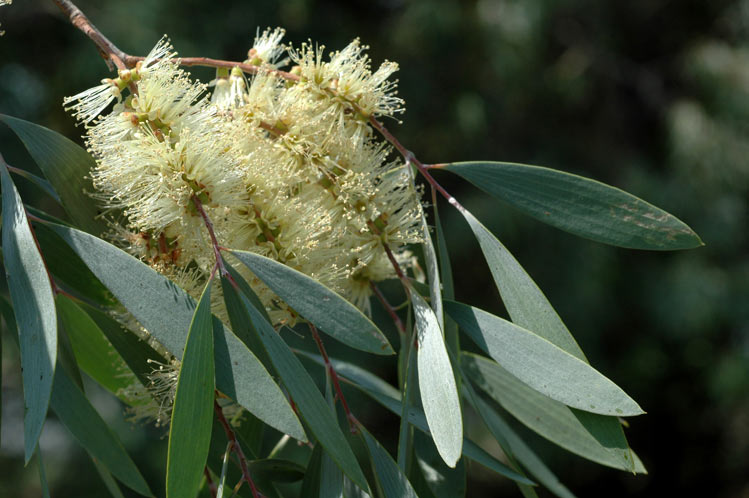
- Melaleuca cajuputi

Conservation status
- Least Concern (IUCN 3.1)

Scientific classification
- Kingdom: Plantae
- Clade: Tracheophytes
- Clade: Angiosperms
- Clade: Eudicots
- Clade: Rosids
- Order: Myrtales
- Family: Myrtaceae
- Genus: Melaleuca
- Species: M. cajuputi

Binomial name
- Melaleuca cajuputi Powell
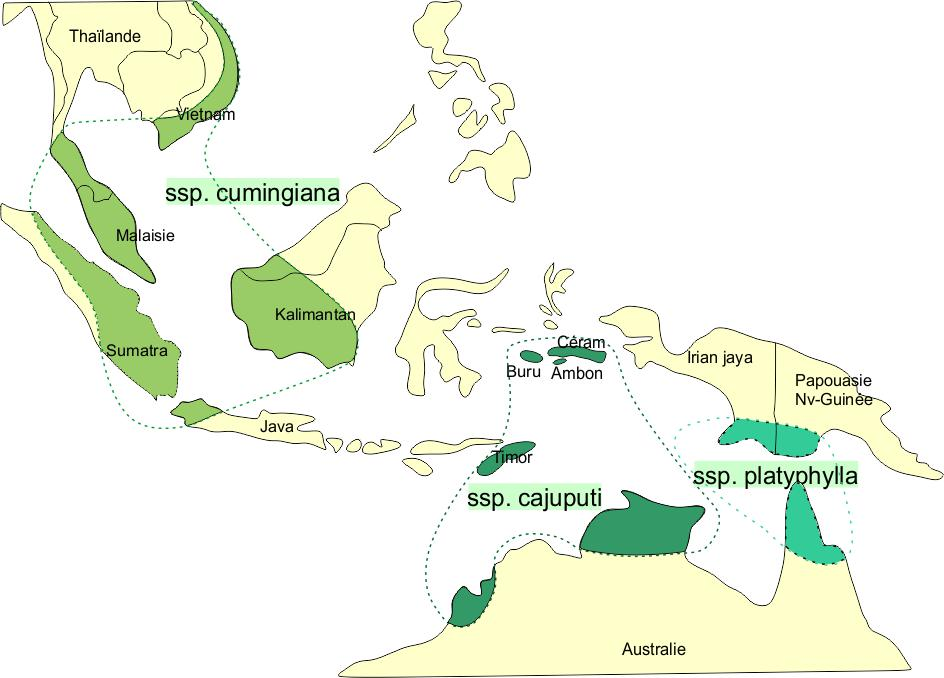

Synonyms
- Melaleuca saligna (J.F.Gmel.) Reinw. ex Blume; Melaleuca trinervis Buch.-Ham.; Pimentus saligna (J.F.Gmel.) Raf.

= Melaleuca cajuputi =

Cajuput

Species of flowering plant

Melaleuca cajuputi, commonly known as cajuput or white samet is a plant in the myrtle family, Myrtaceae and is widespread in Australia, Southeast Asia, New Guinea and the Torres Strait islands. It is a medium to tall tree with papery bark, silvery new growth and white or greenish flower spikes. It has important uses as a source of cajuput oil.

== Description ==
Melaleuca cajuputi is usually a medium to large tree, often growing to 35 metres (100 ft) and sometimes to 46 metres (200 ft) with grey, brownish or whitish papery bark. The new growth is silky-hairy, becoming glabrous as it matures. The leaves are arranged alternately 40–140 millimetres (2–6 in) long and 7.5–60 millimetres (0.3–2 in) wide, tapering at both ends. The flowers are white, cream or greenish-yellow mostly in dense spikes at the ends of the branches which continue to grow after flowering but also often in the axils of the upper leaves. The spikes contain 8 to 20 groups of flowers, each group with three flowers. The stamens are grouped in five bundles around the flower, each bundle containing 6 to 18 stamens. Timing of flowering varies with subspecies. The fruits are woody, cup-shaped capsules clustered loosely along the branches, each fruit 2–2.8 millimetres (0.08–0.1 in) long.

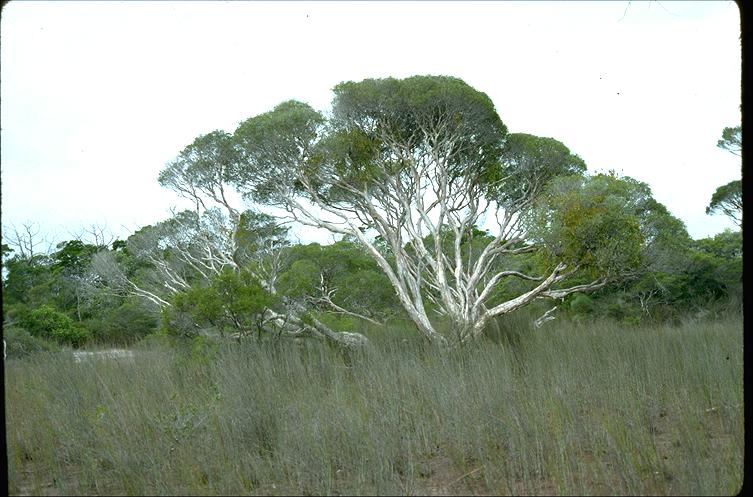
Habit

== Taxonomy and naming ==
Melaleuca cajuputi was first formally described in 1809 by Thomas Powell in Pharmacopoeia of the Royal College of Physicians of London with a reference to an earlier (1747) description by Rumphius in Herbarium Amboinense. The specific epithet (cajuputi) is from Malay name for the plant, kayu putih, meaning "white tree".

Three subspecies have been described, and the names have been accepted by Plants of the World Online:

- Melaleuca cajuputi Powell subsp. cajuputi has leaves 7–26 millimetres (0.3–1 in) wide, seven to ten stamens per bundle and flowers from March to November;
- Melaleuca cajuputi subsp. cumingiana (Turcz.) Barlow has leaves 40–200 millimetres (2–8 in) long and 10–20 millimetres (0.4–0.8 in) wide, there are seven to nine stamens per bundle and flowers from February to December;
- Melaleuca cajuputi subsp. platyphylla Barlow has leaves (15–60 millimetres (0.6–2 in) wide), eight to thirteen stamens per bundle and flowers from January to May and August to September.

The epithet cumingiana honours Hugh Cuming and platyphylla means "flat- or wide-leaved".

== Distribution and habitat ==
Melaleuca cajuputi subsp. cajuputi occurs in the Dampier Peninsula, Calder River, Fitzroy Crossing district in the Central Kimberley biogeographic zone in Western Australia, the northern part of the Northern Territory, Ambon Island, Buru Island of Maluku, and East Timor. It grows in woodland, vine forest, gallery forest and savannah forest, on clayey and peaty loam.

Melaleuca cajuputi subsp. cumingiana (Turcz.) Barlow occurs in Myanmar, Thailand, Vietnam, Malaysia and Indonesia (Sumatra, West Java and south-west Kalimantan). It grows in coastal swamp forest. In Thailand, the species is known as White Samet.

Melaleuca cajuputi subsp. platyphylla Barlow occurs in New Guinea, the Torres Strait islands and north-western Queensland as far south as Cairns. It grows in similar habitats to subsp. cajuputi.

== Uses ==
=== Timber ===
In Southeast Asia, Melaleuca cajuputi is used as a fuel and for making charcoal. It is used on a small scale for supporting columns, frames and floorboards in house construction and for fences. The bark has been used as roofing material and a sealant in boat construction including as a caulking material for boats in Indonesia.

=== Essential oils ===
Indigenous Australian people used the leaves of this species to treat aches and pains and inhaled vapours from the crushed leaves to treat respiratory infections. In Thailand the leaves are used to make a herbal tea as a treatment for a range of medical problems. In many parts of Asia, the oil which gives the tree its name - cajuput oil is used as a liniment and inhalant.

Commercial cajuput oil is mostly obtained from Melaleuca cajuputi subsp. cajuputi. This oil is a pale yellow liquid and contains up to 60% 1,8-cineole, the main antimicrobial component of the oil . Cajuput oil has been classified as non-toxic and non-sensitizing, although skin irritation may occur at high concentrations. It has been reported to be useful as an insect repellant, as a sedative and relaxant and is useful in treating roundworms and urino-genital infections. It is used to flavour foods and to add to the fragrance of soaps and cosmetics.

== External source ==
- Herbarium Amboinense. Vol. 2. 1747.
