= Tea tree oil =

Essential oil derived from leaves

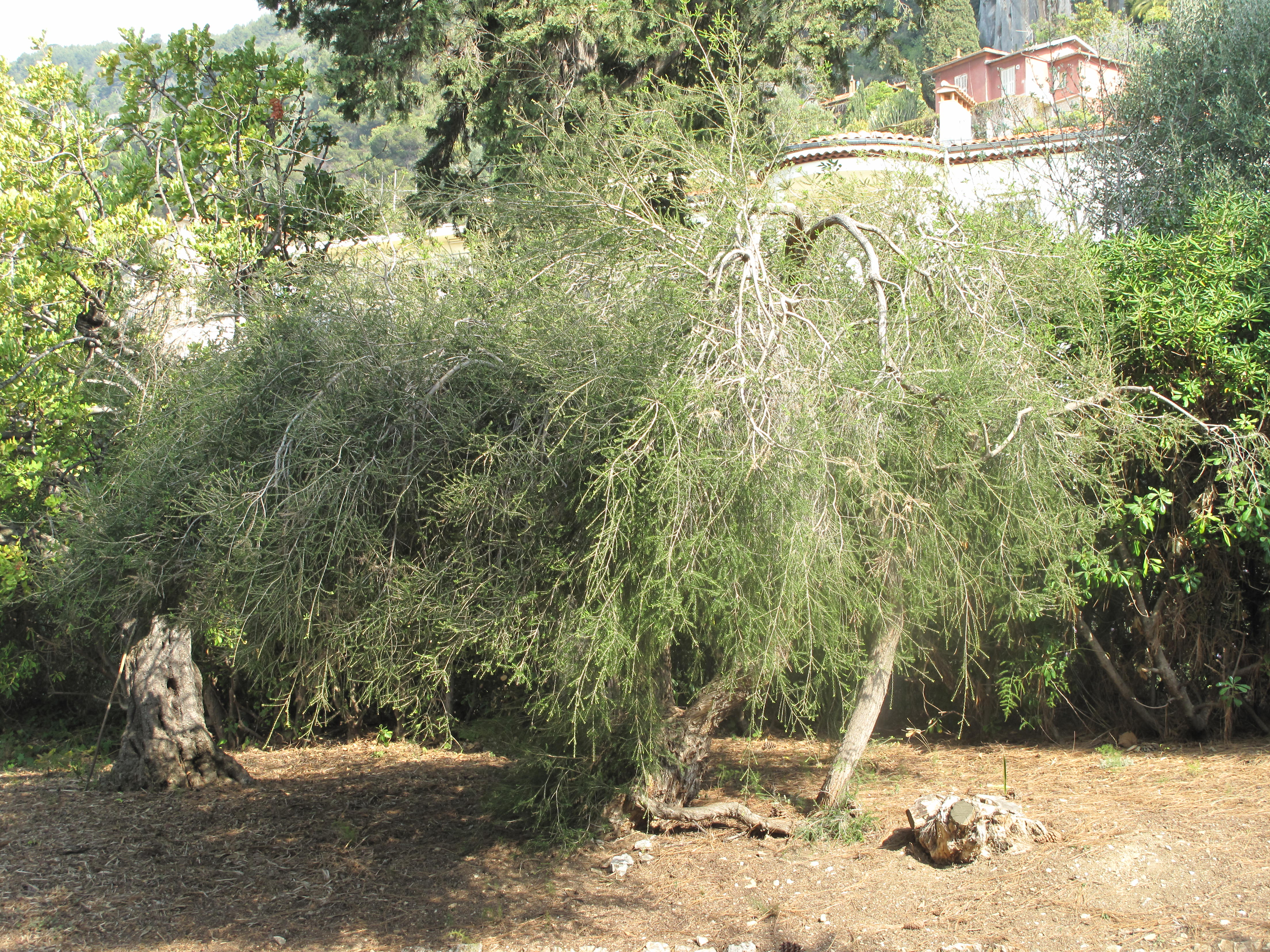
Origin of this essential oil, the tea tree, Melaleuca alternifolia

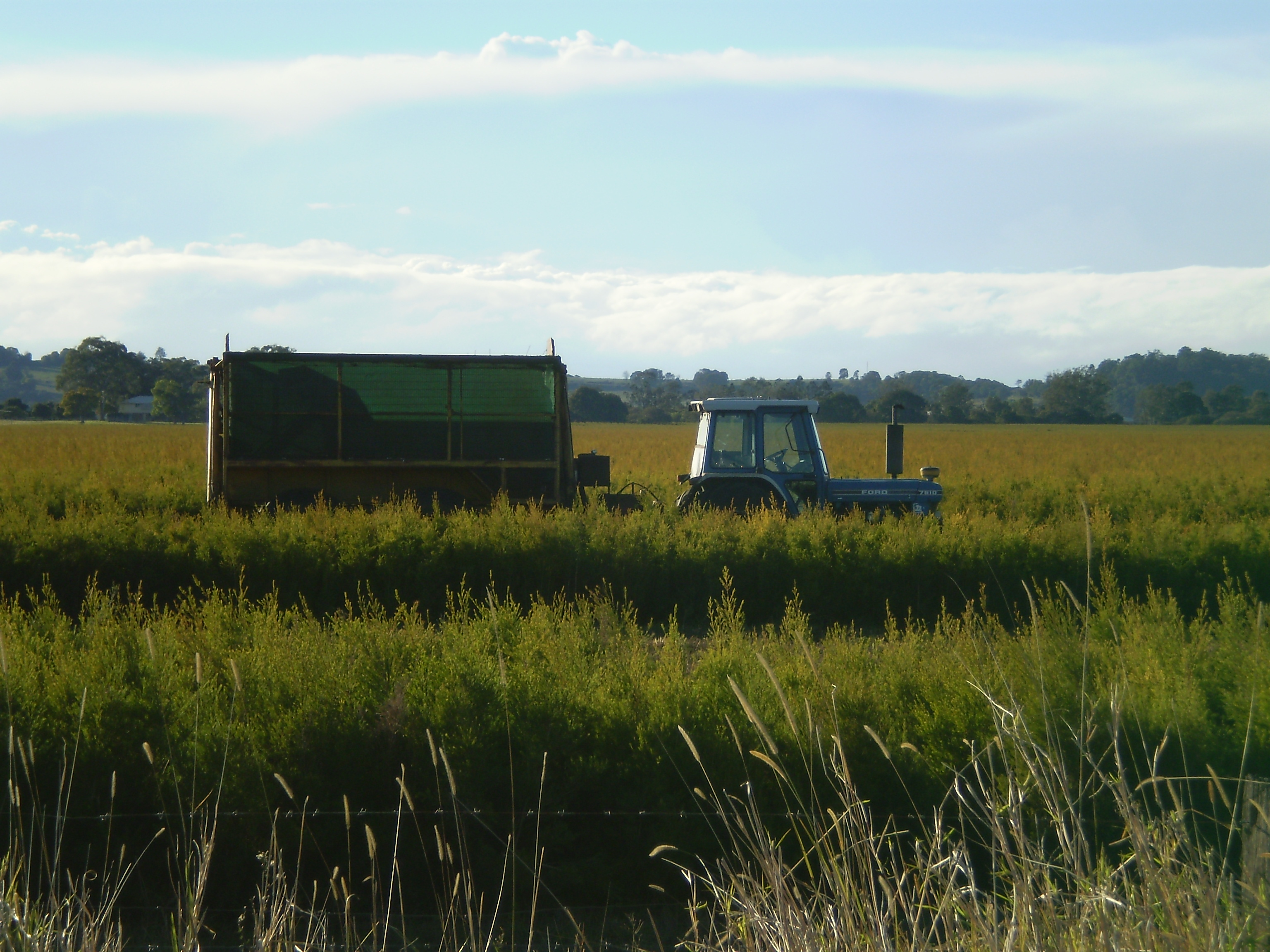
Tea tree plantation, Coraki, New South Wales

Tea tree oil, also known as melaleuca oil, is an essential oil with a fresh, camphoraceous odour and a colour that ranges from pale yellow to nearly colourless and clear. It is derived from the leaves of the tea tree, Melaleuca alternifolia, native to southeast Queensland and the northeast coast of New South Wales, Australia. The oil comprises many constituent chemicals, and its composition changes if it is exposed to air and oxidises. Commercial use of tea tree oil began in the 1920s, pioneered by the entrepreneur Arthur Penfold.

There is little evidence for the effectiveness of tea tree oil in treating mite-infected crusting of eyelids. In traditional medicine, it may be applied topically in low concentrations for skin diseases.

Tea tree oil is neither a patented product nor an approved drug in the United States, although it has been used in skin care products and is approved as a complementary medicine for aromatherapy in Australia. It is poisonous if consumed by mouth and is unsafe for children.

== Uses ==
Although tea tree oil is claimed to be useful for treating dandruff, acne, lice, herpes, insect bites, scabies, and skin fungal or bacterial infections, and while evidence exists to support some of these claims, there are a limited number of research studies. A 2015 Cochrane review of acne complementary therapies found a single low-quality trial showing benefit on skin lesions compared to placebo. Tea tree oil was also used during World War II to treat skin lesions of munitions factory workers.

According to the Committee on Herbal Medicinal Products (CHMP) of the European Medicines Agency, traditional usage suggests that tea tree oil is a possible treatment for "small, superficial wounds, insect bites, and small boils" and that it may reduce itching in minor cases of athlete's foot. The CHMP states that tea tree oil products should not be used on people under 12 years of age.

Tea tree oil is not recommended for treating nail fungus because it is yet to be proven effective, It is not recommended for treating head lice in children because its effectiveness and safety have not been established and it could cause skin irritation or allergic reactions. Tea tree oil is one of many natural products promoted as a treatment for demodex mite infestations, but there is uncertainty about the effectiveness of 5-50% solution, and any overall effectiveness is offset by unwanted adverse effects and toxicity. Tea tree oil exhibits anti-microbial, anti-fungal and antibacterial properties.

== Toxicity ==
Tea tree oil is highly toxic when ingested orally. It may cause drowsiness, confusion, hallucinations, coma, unsteadiness, weakness, vomiting, diarrhoea, nausea, blood-cell abnormalities, and severe rashes. It should be kept away from pets and children. It should not be used in or around the mouth.

Application of tea tree oil to the skin can cause an allergic reaction in some, the potential for which increases as the oil ages and its chemical composition changes. Adverse effects include skin irritation, allergic contact dermatitis, systemic contact dermatitis, linear immunoglobulin A disease, erythema multiforme-like reactions, and systemic hypersensitivity reactions. Allergic reactions may be due to the various oxidation products that are formed by exposure of the oil to light and air. Consequently, oxidised tea tree oil should not be used.

In Australia, tea tree oil is one of the many essential oils causing poisoning, mostly of children. From 2014 to 2018, 749 cases were reported in New South Wales, accounting for 17% of essential oil poisoning incidents.

=== Hormonal effects ===
Tea tree oil potentially poses a risk for causing abnormal breast enlargement in men and prepubertal children. A 2018 study by the National Institute of Environmental Health Sciences found four of the constituent chemicals (eucalyptol, 4-terpineol, dipentene, and alpha-terpineol) are endocrine disruptors, raising concerns of potential environmental health impacts from the oil.

=== In animals ===
In dogs and cats, death or transient signs of toxicity (lasting two to three days), such as lethargy, weakness, incoordination, and muscle tremors, have been reported after external application at high doses.

As a test of toxicity by oral intake, the median lethal dose (LD_{50}) in rats is 1.9–2.4 ml/kg.

== Composition and characteristics ==
Tea tree oil composition, as per ISO 4730 (2017)
Component	Concentration
terpinen-4-ol	35.0–48.0%
γ-terpinene	14–28%
α-terpinene	6.0–12.0%
1,8-cineole	traces–10.0%
terpinolene	1.5–5.0%
α-terpineol	2.0–5.0%
α-pinene	1.0–4.0%
p-cymene	0.5–8.0%
sabinene	traces–3.5%
limonene	0.5–1.5%
aromadendrene	0.2–3.0%
ledene	0.1–3.0%
globulol	traces–1.0%
viridiflorol	traces–1.0%

Tea tree oil is defined by the International Standard ISO 4730 ("Oil of Melaleuca, terpinen-4-ol type"), containing terpinen-4-ol, γ-terpinene, and α-terpinene as about 70% to 90% of whole oil, while p-cymene, terpinolene, α-terpineol, and α-pinene collectively account for some 15% of the oil (table). The oil has been described as colourless to pale yellow with an aroma described as "citrus, spicy, terpenic, nutmeg, pine".

Tea tree oil products contain various phytochemicals, among which terpinen-4-ol is the major component. Adverse reactions diminish with lower eucalyptol content.

== History and extraction ==
The name "tea tree" is used for several plants, mostly from Australia and New Zealand, from the family Myrtaceae related to the myrtle. The use of the name probably originated from Captain James Cook's description of one of these shrubs that he used to make an infusion to drink in place of tea.

The commercial tea tree oil industry originated in the 1920s when Australian chemist Arthur Penfold investigated the business potential of a number of native extracted oils; he reported that tea tree oil had promise, as it exhibited antiseptic properties.

Tea tree oil was first extracted from Melaleuca alternifolia in Australia, and this species remains the most important commercially. In the 1970s and 1980s, commercial plantations began to produce large quantities of tea tree oil from M. alternifolia. Many of these plantations are located in New South Wales. Since the 1970s and 80s, the industry has expanded to include several other species for their extracted oil: Melaleuca armillaris and Melaleuca styphelioides in Tunisia and Egypt; Melaleuca leucadendra in Egypt, Malaysia, and Vietnam; Melaleuca acuminata in Tunisia; Melaleuca ericifolia in Egypt; and Melaleuca quinquenervia in the United States (considered an invasive species in Florida).

Similar oils can also be produced by water distillation from Melaleuca linariifolia and Melaleuca dissitiflora. Whereas the availability and nonproprietary nature of tea tree oil would make it – if proved effective – particularly well-suited to a disease such as scabies that affects poor people disproportionately, those same characteristics diminish corporate interest in its development and validation.

== See also ==
- Cajeput oil — derived from M. cajuputi
- Essential oil
- Melaleuca alternifolia
