= Narrow-leaved paperbark =

Narrow-leaved paperbark is a common name used to describe several species of flowering plants in the genus Melaleuca:

- Melaleuca alternifolia, endemic to Australia
- Melaleuca linariifolia, endemic to Eastern Australia
