= Timorex Gold =

Timorex Gold is a natural botanical broad spectrum fungicide with prophylactic and curative activity, based on a plant extract of Melaleuca alternifolia. Timorex Gold is effective against a wide range of plant-pathogenic fungi, including Oomycetes, Ascomycetes, and Basidiomycota, on numerous crops, including vegetables, herbs, grapevines, fruit trees, and banana. Timorex Gold has demonstrated high efficacy against Black Sigatoka (Black leaf streak disease in banana). Plants damaged by Black Sigatoka have a significant reduction in the photosynthesizing area of the leaf, and fruit yield losses can reach 50% through premature maturation.

Black Sigatoka is caused by Mycosphaerella fijiensis (Morelet), and is considered the most damaging and costly disease of commercial banana and plantain. It originated in the Pacific region, was reported in Fiji in 1963, and since then has reached other banana producing countries. Control of this disease may require as many as 70 treatments per year using synthetic fungicides.

Timorex Gold's special formulation contains multiple components, mostly terpenes and their alcohols, which have been proven antiseptic, fungicide and bactericide properties. The unique and powerful potential of this plant extract is highly effective for control in agricultural crops while significantly reducing the chemical risk to operators and the environment.

== History ==
In 2003, scientists at Biomor, s member of the Stockton Group Research and Development Innovation Center, commenced research on the use of Melaleuca alternifolia in agriculture for the management and control of bacterial and fungal diseases. Studies dealing with non-plant pathogens confirmed that the fungicidal and anti-microbial activity of M. alternifolia resulted from its ability to disrupt the permeability barrier in membrane structures. In yeast cells and isolated mitochondria, α-pinene and β-pinene, plant extract of "M. alternifolia" destroy cellular integrity, inhibit respiration and ion transport processes and increase membrane permeability.

== Registration ==
The active substance of Timorex Gold was approved by the European Union to be included in the positive list of the EU, in Annex 1 of Directive 91/414/EEC for the registration of pesticides.

== Toxicology ==
The active ingredient of Timorex Gold is a natural product that is classified as a low-risk substance for which Maximum Residue Limits (MRL) are not required in Europe. Stockton is in the process of obtaining similar exemptions in other areas of the world such as North America and Asia.

== Organic accreditation ==
Timorex Gold is recognized to be a product that is used in both conventional and organic agriculture. Timorex Gold meets the requirements of European Union, NOP and JAS and is certified by the following entities:

- Israeli Bio-Organic, Agriculture Association (I.B.O.A.A.)
- International Federation of Organic Agriculture Movements (IFOAM))
- BCS Öko-Garantie
- State of Israel Ministry of Agriculture & Rural Development
- Control Union (CU) Certifications
