= Petitgrain =

Essential oil from the bitter orange tree

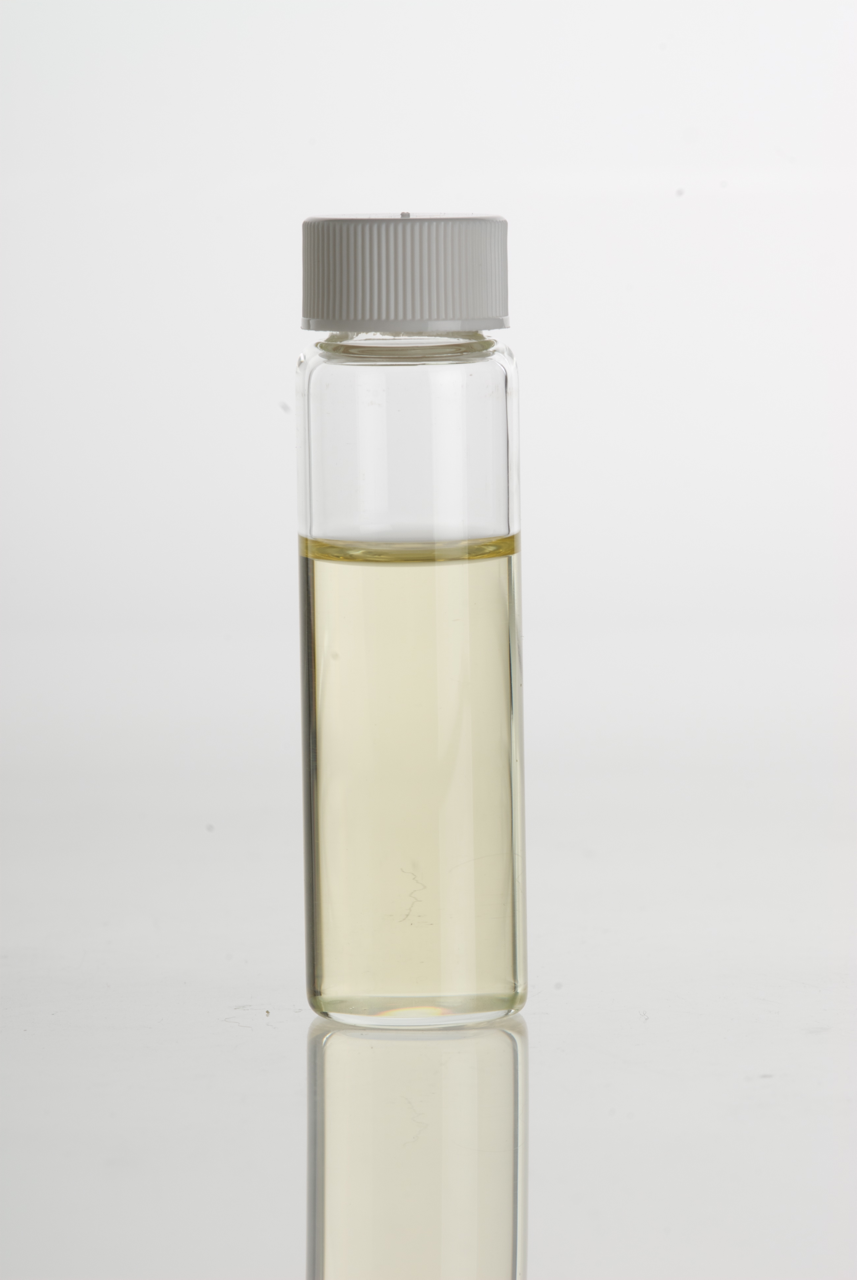
Petitgrain (Citrus aurantium ssp. amara) essential oil in a clear glass vial

Petitgrain (pronounced [pəti gʁɛ̃]) is an essential oil that is extracted from the leaves and green twigs of the bitter orange tree (Citrus aurantium ssp. amara) via steam distillation. It is also known as petitgrain bigarade.

== Etymology ==
Petitgrain (Fr.: “little grain”) gains its name from the fact that it used to be extracted from the unripe small green fruits of the plant.

== Production ==
Various essential oil products extracted from components of an orange tree (image adapted from Techniques for Oil Extraction

Its main regions of production are Paraguay and France, with the former's product being of higher odour tenacity. The oil has a greenish woody orange smell that is widely used in perfumery and found in colognes. Though distilled from the same botanical species as neroli and bitter orange essential oil, petitgrain bigarade oil possesses its own characteristically unique aroma. The oil is distilled from the leaves and sometimes the twigs and branches of the tree, whereas neroli is distilled from the blossoms and bitter orange oil is typically cold pressed from the rinds of the fruits. Petitgrain mandarin (Petit grain Mandarine) is distilled from leaves and branches of trees producing mandarin fruit.

== Chemical composition ==
Oil	Binominal name	Plant	Distilled parts	Components
Petitgrain bigarade	Citrus × aurantium subsp. amara	Bitter orange	leaves, (twigs, branches)	Linalyl acetate(45%), Linalool(20%), β-Pinene(<10%), α-Terpineol(6%), Geranyl acetate(<5%), cis-β-Ocimene(<5%)
Petitgrain mandarin	Citrus reticulata	Mandarin orange	leaves, (twigs, branches)	Methyl anthranilate(50%), γ-Terpinene(15%), Limonene(5%), p-Cymene(3%)
Petitgrain citronnier	Citrus limon	Lemon	leaves, (twigs, branches)	Limonene, Citral, Geranyl acetate, β-caryophyllene

== Use ==
It is used in perfumery and aromatherapy as fresh-scented essential oils. As of 1923, it was part of the formula for Pepsi-Cola.
