= Terpinen-4-ol =

Names
- Preferred IUPAC name 4-Methyl-1-(propan-2-yl)cyclohex-3-en-1-ol

Identifiers
CAS Number	562-74-3
3D model (JSmol)	Interactive image
ChEMBL	ChEMBL507795
ChemSpider	10756
ECHA InfoCard	100.008.396
MeSH	terpinenol-4
PubChem CID	11230
UNII	L65MV77ZG6
CompTox Dashboard (EPA)	DTXSID4044824
- InChI: InChI=1S/C10H18O/c1-8(2)10(11)6-4-9(3)5-7-10/h4,8,11H,5-7H2,1-3H3 Key: WRYLYDPHFGVWKC-UHFFFAOYSA-N; InChI=1/C10H18O/c1-8(2)10(11)6-4-9(3)5-7-10/h4,8,11H,5-7H2,1-3H3 Key: WRYLYDPHFGVWKC-UHFFFAOYAQ
- SMILES: CC1=CCC(CC1)(C(C)C)O

Properties
Chemical formula	C_{10}H_{18}O
Molar mass	154.253 g·mol^{−1}
Odor	peppery, woody, earthy
Density	0.9315 g/cm^{3}
Melting point	−66 °C (−87 °F; 207 K)
Boiling point	212 °C (414 °F; 485 K)
- Except where otherwise noted, data are given for materials in their standard state (at 25 °C [77 °F], 100 kPa). verify (what is ?) Infobox references

Terpinen-4-ol is an isomer of terpineol with the chemical formula C_{10}H_{18}O. A primary constituent of tea tree oil, it is obtained as an extract from the leaves, branches, and bark of the "tea tree" Melaleuca alternifolia Cheel. Despite considerable basic and preliminary clinical research of terpinen-4-ol and tea tree oil, its biological properties and potential for clinical uses have not been established as of 2019. It may be a factor in the contact dermatitis of tea tree oil when used topically.

Terpinen-4-ol occurs in Juniperus communis and is thought to be the reason why this wood is highly resistant to rot.

== Synthesis ==
Terpinen-4-ol can be synthesized from terpinolene (1) via photooxygenation, reduction of the resulting hydroperoxide (2), and selective hydrogenation of the terminal double bond in 3.

Synthesis of terpinen-4-ol
