= Arthur R. Penfold =

Australian chemist and museum director

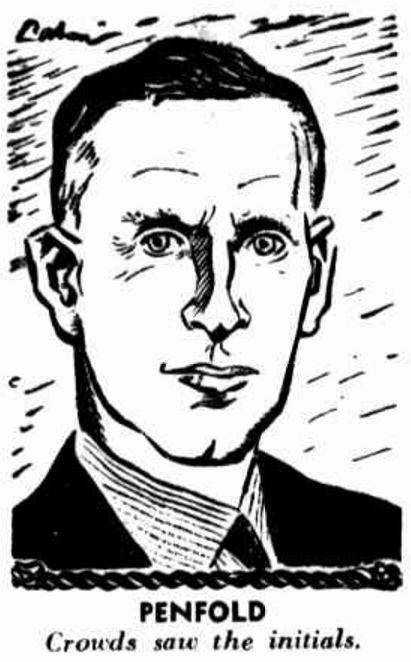
Sketch of Arthur de Ramon Penfold from The Sun (Sydney), 23 May 1943

Arthur de Ramon Penfold (4 August 1890 – 16 June 1980) was an Australian chemist and museum director. He is best known today for his work on the essential oils of Australian plants, especially tea tree oil.

== Early life ==
Penfold was born in Sydney, New South Wales, the oldest of four sons of David de Ramon Penfold (1864-1901), a clerk, and his wife Elizabeth (Emanuel) Penfold (1866-1937). His father's death when Penfold was eleven years old forced him to leave school at fourteen to work as an office boy at a paint company. He went on to work at another paint company, becoming an accountant there in 1908.

== Phytochemistry ==
However, Penfold was curious about the technology of paints and started taking evening classes in chemistry at Sydney Technical College. He was inspired by the lectures of Henry George Smith and became interested in plant extracts and essential oils, as Smith was. In 1915 he became a research chemist and assistant plant manager for the eucalyptus oil distillers Gillard Gordon Ltd. In 1919 he became Smith's assistant at the Technological Museum in Sydney, and a year later became the museum's economic chemist on Smith's retirement.

Penfold's work in phytochemistry soon gained world-wide recognition. By 1921 he had demonstrated the molecular structure of piperitone and how menthol and thymol could be produced from it. In all he published about a hundred research papers, many with fellow phytochemists Frank Richard Morrison and J. L. Willis. Penfold's work testing a number of essential oils produced from Australian plants in the 1920s led him to suggest the commercial production of tea tree oil, as it seemed to have antiseptic properties.

== Museum work ==
In 1927 Penfold was appointed curator and in 1948 director of the Technological Museum. Penfold's interest in plastics led to a 1934 Plastics Industry Exhibition, a joint project with the Sydney Technical College. On a 1938 grant from the Carnegie Corporation of New York he travelled to study the practices of American and European museums. He introduced fluorescent lighting of the museum's exhibits in the 1930s and opened the first museum planetarium in Australia at the museum in 1950. In 1945 legislation placed the museum under a trust, a measure Penfold had worked for.

== Other work ==
Penfold was active in scientific societies in Australia. He was a council member and in 1935 president of the Royal Society of New South Wales, and a founder and the first secretary-treasurer of the Art Galleries and Museums Association of Australia and New Zealand. During World War II he served on various government scientific advisory committees and visited North America in 1945 to investigate recent advances in plastics. Following his retirement from the museum in 1955 he went to work for Monsanto Chemicals (Australia) Ltd., a plastics manufacturer. He became a life member and the first technical secretary of the Plastics Institute of Australia.

== Honours ==
He was given the H. G. Smith Memorial Medal in 1934 by the Royal Australian Chemical Institute, the medal of the Royal Society of New South Wales in 1951, and the Fritzsche Award from the American Chemical Society in 1954.

== Personal life ==
Penfold married Eunice Gilbert Gardner (died 1957) on 17 August 1915; they had one daughter, Dulcie Joy Penfold (1917-2011). On 18 June 1959 Penfold married Lorna Mae Gardner, his first wife's sister.

He died in Canberra on 16 June 1980.

Dulcie Penfold rose to level of Director at the National Library of Australia and received an MBE in 1976 for her service there.

== Publications ==
- Guide to the extraction of eucalyptus oil in the field (with F. R. Morrison) - 1922
- Australian tea trees of economic value (with F. R. Morrison) - 1929
- Eucalyptus: The Essence of Australia - 1930
- Grass Tree Resin - 1931
- Commercial eucalyptus oils - 1933
- Tung oil (Chinese wood oil) from Australian grown trees of Aleurites fordii (Hemsley) : with a note on A. montana (with F. R. Morrison) - 1934
- The volatile oils of the Australian flora - 1950
- Plastics and synthetic fibres - 1956
- The Eucalypts: Botany, Chemistry, Cultivation and Utilization (with J. L. Willis) - 1961
