= Terpineol =

alpha-terpineol
Skeletal formula
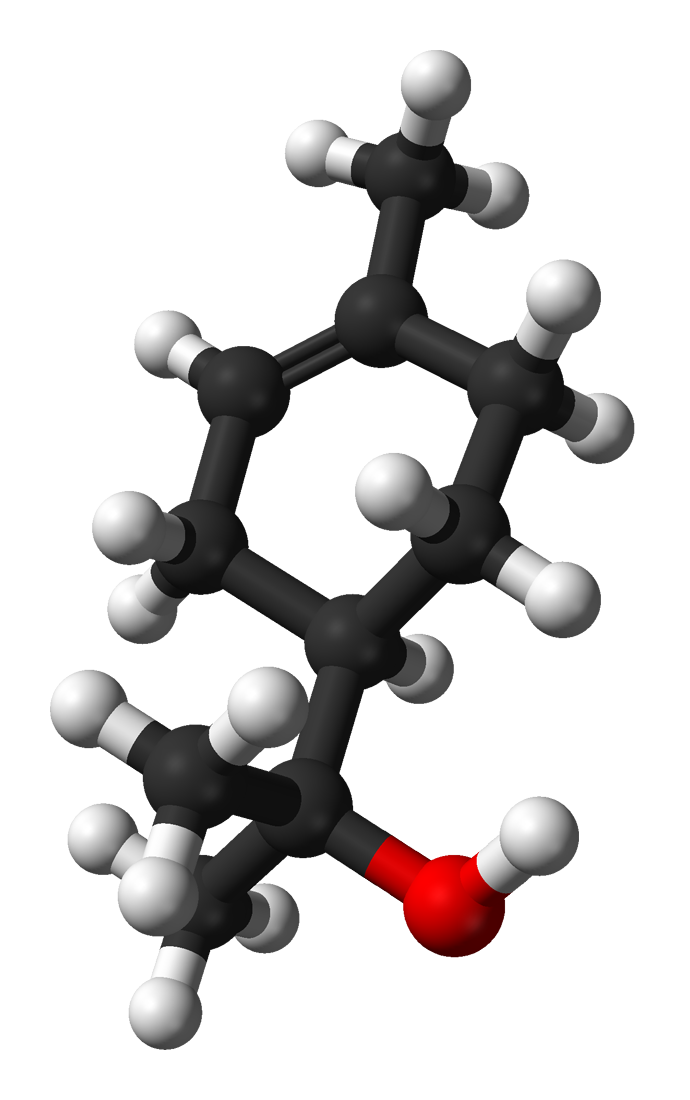
Ball-and-stick model

Names
- IUPAC names p-Menth-1-en-8-ol; 2-(4-Methylcyclohex-3-en-1-yl)propan-2-ol
- Other names: 2-(4-Methyl-1-cyclohex-3-enyl)propan-2-ol; alpha-Terpineol; α-Terpineol; α,α,4-Trimethylcyclohex-3-ene-1-methanol; Terpene alcohol; Terpineol AP

Identifiers
CAS Number	α: 98-55-5; β: 138-87-4; γ: 586-81-2; 4-: 562-74-3
3D model (JSmol)	α: Interactive image
Beilstein Reference	2325137
ChEBI	α: CHEBI:22469; β: CHEBI:132899; γ: CHEBI:81151; 4-: CHEBI:78884
ChEMBL	α: ChEMBL507795; 4-: ChEMBL507795
ChemSpider	α: 13850142; β: 8418; γ: 10983; 4-: 10756
EC Number	α: 202-680-6; β: 205-342-6; γ: 209-584-3; 4-: 209-235-5
KEGG	β: C17517; 4-: C17073
PubChem CID	α: 17100; β: 8748; γ: 11467; 4-: 11230
UNII	α: 21334LVV8W; γ: 5PH9U7XEWS
CompTox Dashboard (EPA)	4-: DTXSID4044824
- InChI: InChI=1S/C10H18O/c1-8-4-6-9(7-5-8)10(2,3)11/h4,9,11H,5-7H2,1-3H3 Key: WUOACPNHFRMFPN-UHFFFAOYSA-N; α: InChI=1/C10H18O/c1-8-4-6-9(7-5-8)10(2,3)11/h4,9,11H,5-7H2,1-3H3 Key: WUOACPNHFRMFPN-UHFFFAOYAL
- SMILES: α: C\C1=C\CC(CC1)C(O)(C)C

Properties
Chemical formula	C_{10}H_{18}O
Molar mass	154.253 g·mol^{−1}
Appearance	Colorless liquid
Odor	Pleasant, lilac-like
Density	0.93 g/cm^{3}
Melting point	−35.9 to −28.2 °C (−32.6 to −18.8 °F; 237.2 to 245.0 K) (mixture of isomers)
Boiling point	214–217 °C (417–423 °F; 487–490 K) (mixture of isomers)
Solubility in water	2.42 g/L
Magnetic susceptibility (χ)	−111.9×10^{−6} cm^{3}/mol

Hazards
NFPA 704 (fire diamond)	2 1 0
Flash point	88 °C (190 °F; 361 K)
Safety data sheet (SDS)	External MSDS
- Except where otherwise noted, data are given for materials in their standard state (at 25 °C [77 °F], 100 kPa). verify (what is ?) Infobox references

Terpineol is any of four isomeric monoterpenoids. Terpenoids are terpene that are modified by the addition of a functional group, in this case, an alcohol. Terpineols have been isolated from a variety of sources such as cardamom, cajuput oil, pine oil, and petitgrain oil. Four isomers exist: α-terpineol, β-terpineol, γ-terpineol, and terpinen-4-ol. β-Terpineol and γ-terpineol differ only by the location of the double bond. Terpineol is usually a mixture of these isomers with α-terpineol as the major constituent.

Terpineols: alpha-, beta-, gamma-, and the 4-terpineol isomer

Terpineol has a pleasant odor similar to lilac and is a common ingredient in perfumes, cosmetics, and flavors. α-Terpineol is one of the two most abundant aroma constituents of lapsang souchong tea; the α-terpineol originates in the pine smoke used to dry the tea. (+)-α-Terpineol is a chemical constituent of skullcap.

α-Terpineol has an aroma described as "pine, terpenic, lilac, citrus, woody, floral, resinous, cooling, lemon, lime". Whilst both enantiomers of α-terpineol exhibit a floral lilac aroma, the laevo form (−)-α-terpineol, is reportedly more terpenic. The aroma of β-terpineol is described as "pungent, earthy, woody".. The aroma of γ-terpineol is "pine, floral, lilac". The aroma of 4-terpinenol (also known as terpinen-4-ol or 4-carvomenthenol), is described as "peppery, woody, earthy, musty, sweet, mentholic, citrus, terpenic, spicy".

== Synthesis and biosynthesis ==
Although it is naturally occurring, terpineol is commonly manufactured from alpha-pinene, which is hydrated in the presence of sulfuric acid.

An alternative route starts from limonene:

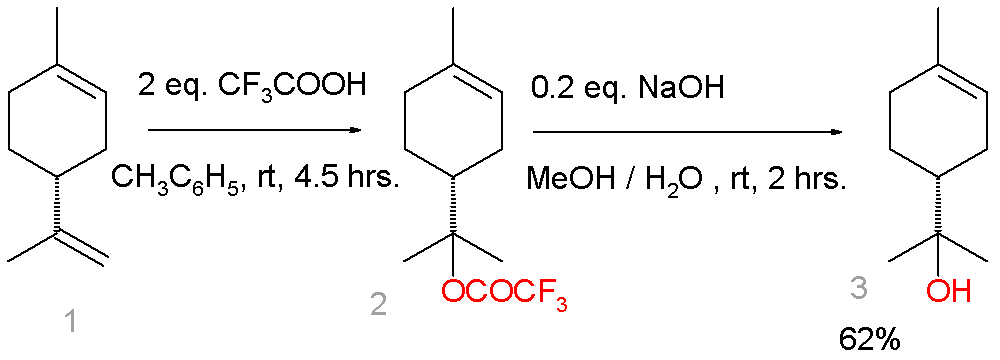
Terpineol synthesis from limonene

Limonene reacts with trifluoroacetic acid in a Markovnikov addition to a trifluoroacetate intermediate, which is easily hydrolyzed with sodium hydroxide to α-terpineol with 7% selectivity. Side-products are β-terpineol in a mixture of the cis isomer, the trans isomer, and 4-terpineol.

The biosynthesis of α-terpineol proceeds from geranyl pyrophosphate, which releases pyrophosphate to give the terpinyl cation. This carbocation is the precursor to many terpenes and terpenoids. Its hydrolysis gives terpineol.

Biosynthetic conversion of geranyl pyrophosphate to the terpenes α-pinene and β-pinene (right) and to α-terpineol (bottom left).
