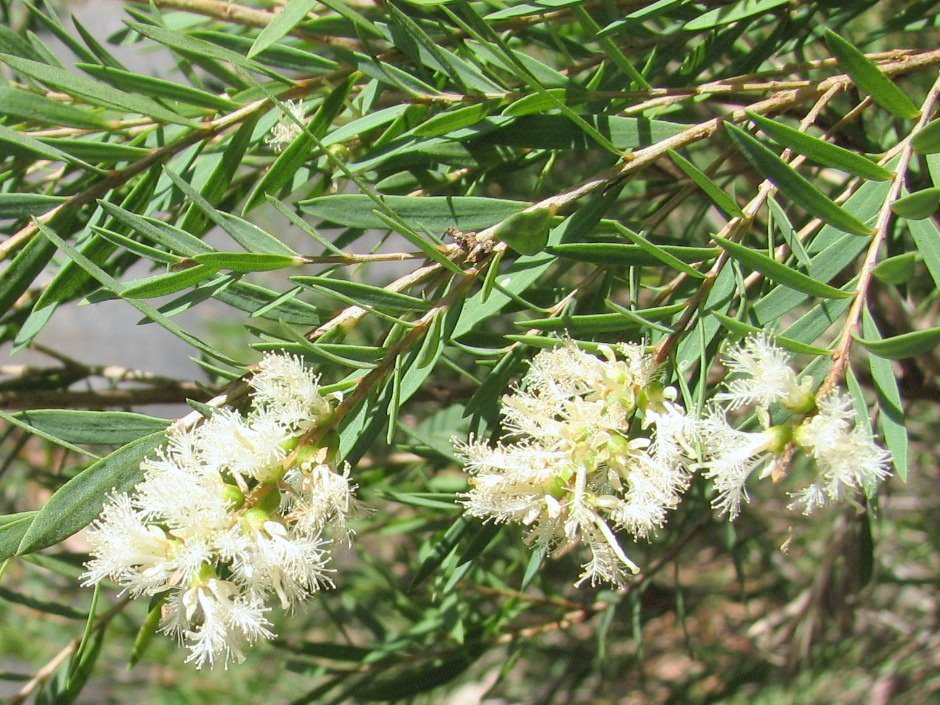
- Melaleuca linariifolia

Conservation status
- Least Concern (IUCN 3.1)

Scientific classification
- Kingdom: Plantae
- Clade: Embryophytes
- Clade: Tracheophytes
- Clade: Spermatophytes
- Clade: Angiosperms
- Clade: Eudicots
- Clade: Rosids
- Order: Myrtales
- Family: Myrtaceae
- Genus: Melaleuca
- Species: M. linariifolia

Binomial name
- Melaleuca linariifolia Sm.

Synonyms
- Melaleuca linariifolia var. typica Domin; Melaleuca stricta Dum.Cours.; Myrtoleucodendron linariifolium (Sm.) Kuntze; Ozandra hyssopifolia (Cav.) Raf.

= Melaleuca linariifolia =

Snow-in-summer

Species of tree

Melaleuca linariifolia is a plant in the myrtle family Myrtaceae, and is endemic to eastern Australia. It is commonly known as snow-in-summer, narrow-leaved paperbark, flax-leaved paperbark and in the language of the Gadigal people as budjur. A hardy plant, it flowers prolifically in late spring or summer, making it a popular garden shrub or small tree in temperate places. Melaleuca trichostachya is a similar species but its leaves are arranged differently and the fruits have projecting valves.

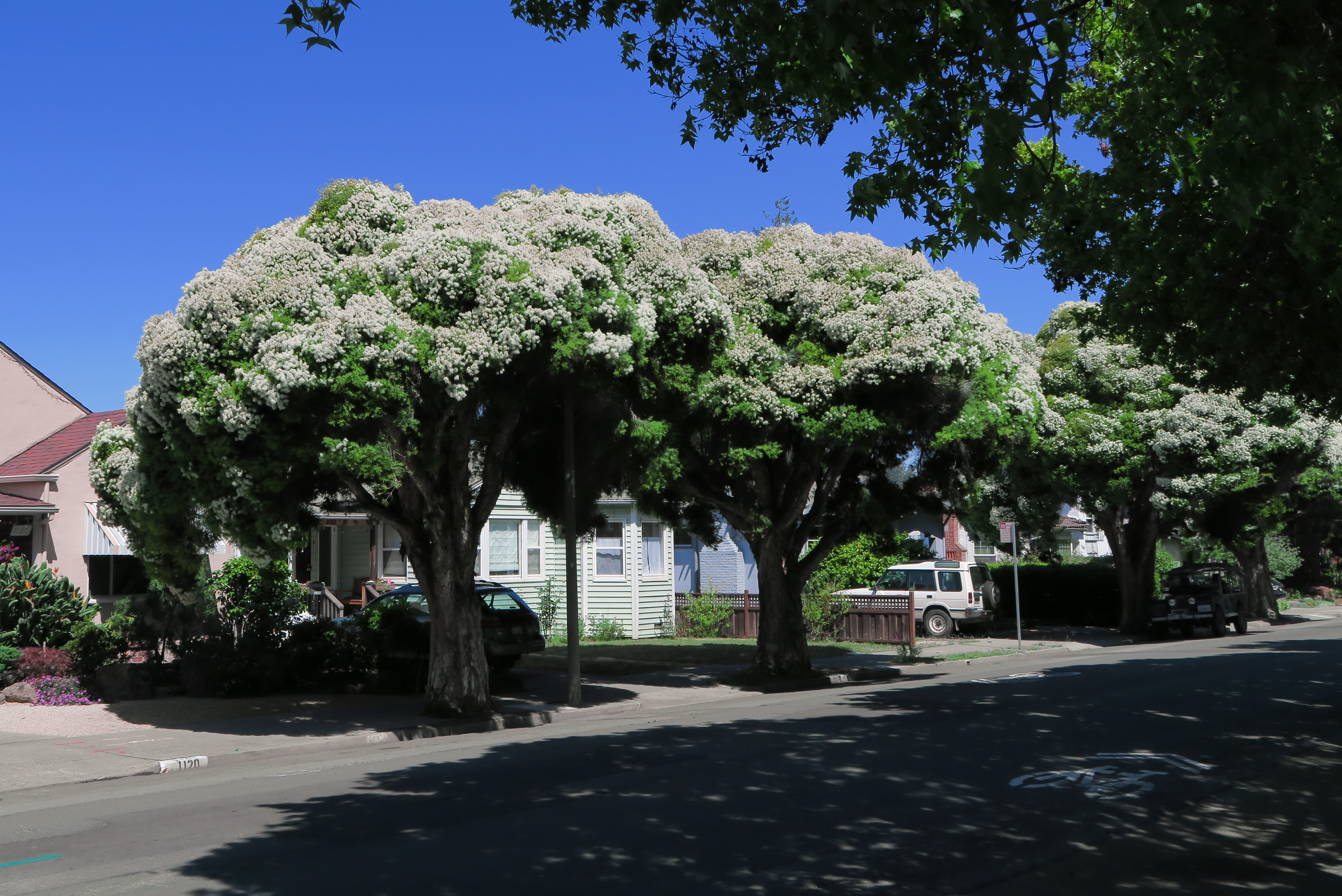
Street trees in Albany, California

== Description ==
Melaleuca linariifolia is a small tree growing to a height of 6–10 m (20–30 ft) with distinctive and attractive white or creamy white, papery bark and a dense canopy. Its leaves are arranged in alternating pairs (decussate), glabrous except when very young, 17–45 mm (0.7–2 in) long, 1–4 mm (0.04–0.2 in) wide, linear to lance-shaped and with a distinct mid-vein.

The flowers are white to creamy-white, perfumed and arranged in spikes on the ends of branches which continue to grow after flowering, sometimes also in the upper leaf axils. Each spike is up to 40 mm (2 in) wide and long and contains 4 to 20 individual flowers. The petals are 2.5–3.3 mm (0.1–0.1 in) long and fall off as the flower matures. The stamens are arranged in five bundles around the flower and each bundle contains 32 to 73 stamens.

The flowers cover the tree over a relatively short period, between October and February and are followed by fruit which are woody capsules, 2.5–4 mm (0.1–0.2 in) long and 4–5 mm (0.16–0.20 in) long scattered along the stems. The fruiting capsules have valves which do not project beyond the rim of the capsule.

== Taxonomy and naming ==
Melaleuca linariifolia was first formally described in 1797 by James Edward Smith in Transactions of the Linnean Society of London. Smith noted that "This, we are told by Mr White, is a large tree, the bark of which is very thick and spongy, serving the purpose of tinder." The specific epithet linariifolia means "with leaves like Linaria" (a genus of plants in the family Plantaginaceae).

== Distribution ==
Snow-in-summer occurs from the Maryborough district in Queensland to Bawley Point in the Ulladulla district in New South Wales. There is also a disjunct population in the Blackdown Tableland National Park in Queensland. It is found in heath and dry sclerophyll forest habitats, usually growing near watercourses or swamps.

== Uses ==
=== Horticulture ===
Melaleuca linariifolia is cultivated as an ornamental tree for parks and gardens and is also used as a screen or windbreak in Australia and overseas. It is popular as a nature strip tree in Melbourne in Victoria. It tolerates both dry and boggy conditions and is frost hardy. It should be planted with caution as it can damage wastewater pipes, and is easily ignitable, so should not be planted in fire-prone areas. It has also become a garden escape in Western Australia, it is however suitable for planting under powerlines and is a food or habitat sources for native animals, including many insects.

There is a range of cultivars including dwarf forms such as 'Snowstorm' which grows to a height of 1.5 metres (5 ft), 'Seafoam' at 2.5 metres (8 ft), and 'Claret Tops' at 1.5 metres (5 ft), which features red coloured new growth.

=== Essential oils ===
This species is rich in essential oils, especially Terpinen-4-ol. It has a wider range of tolerance to environmental conditions than the main current source of "tea tree" oil, Melaleuca alternifolia and therefore has potential as an alternative.

== Gallery ==
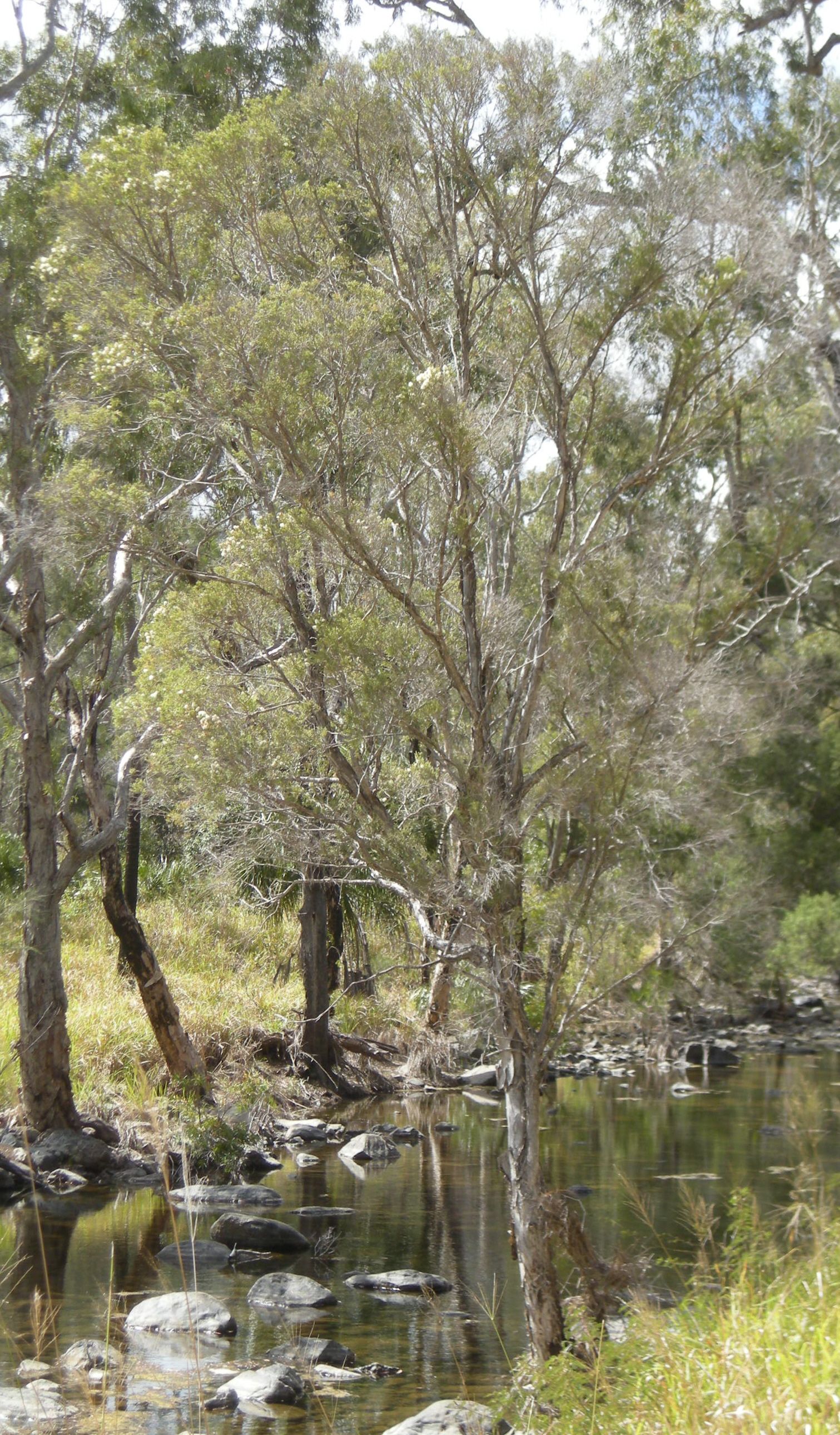
Specimen in Mount Archer National Park

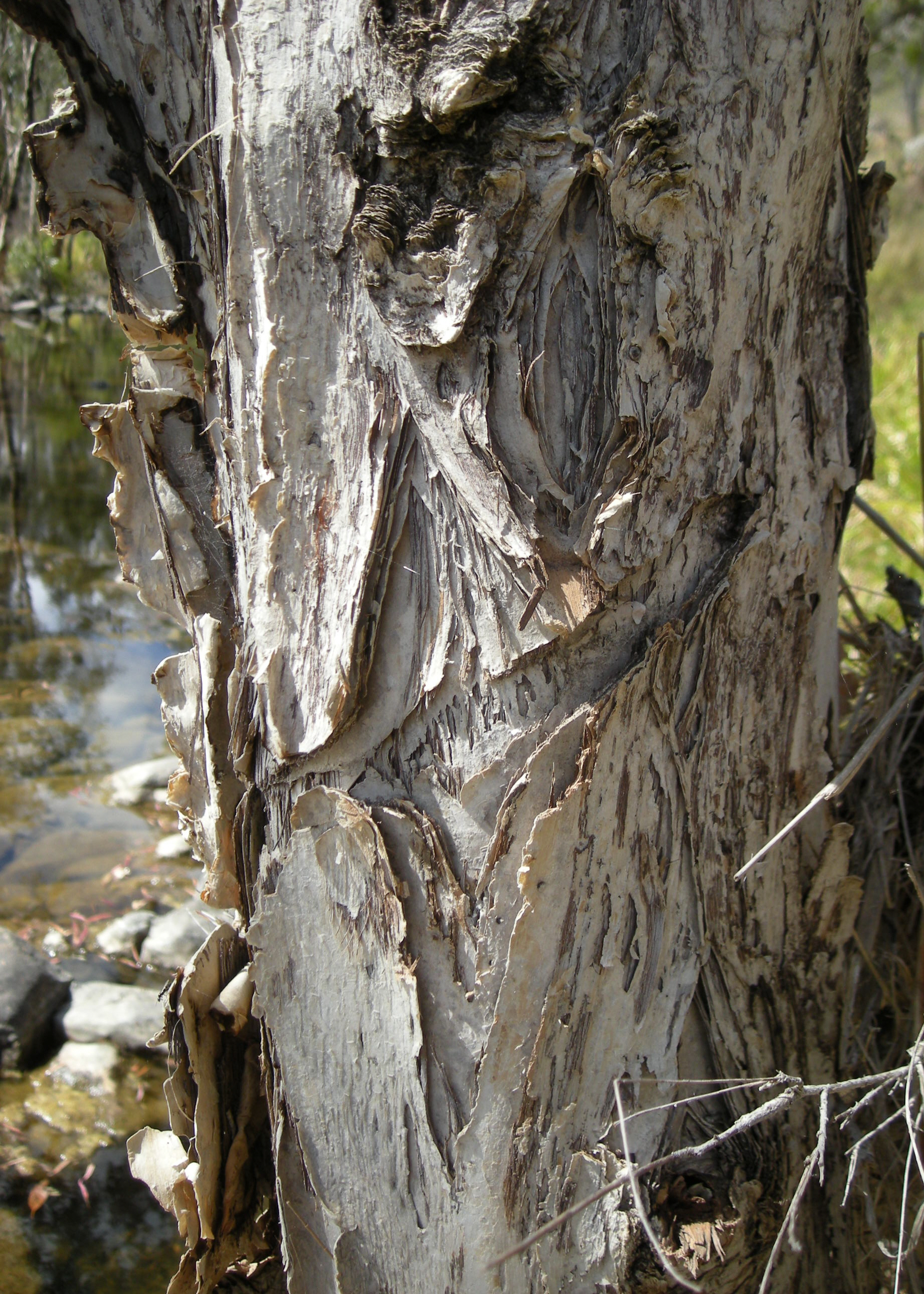
Bark

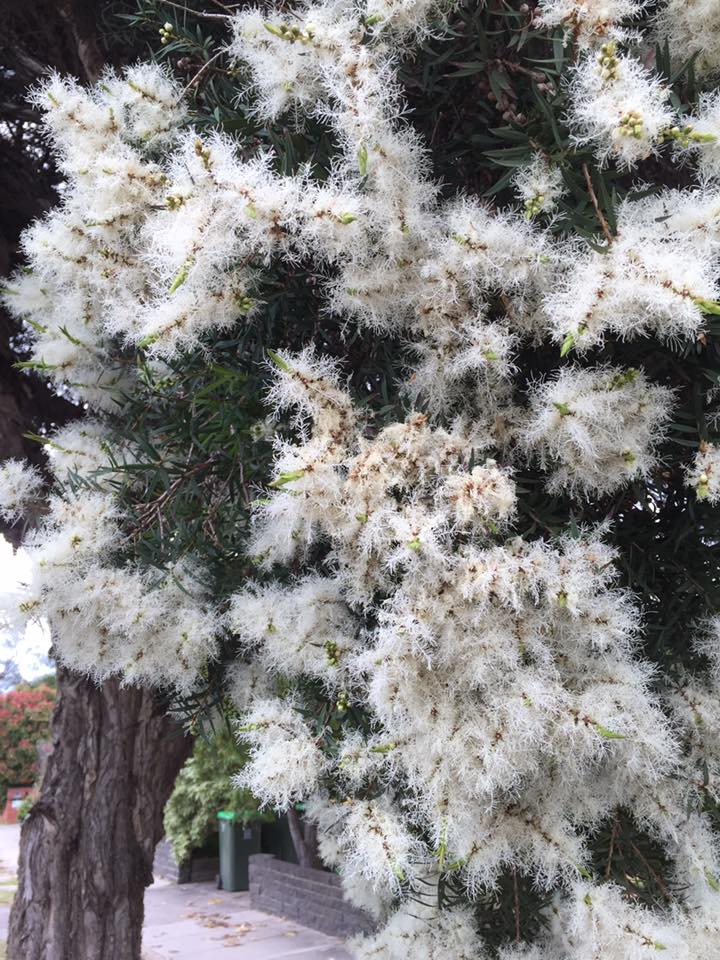
Flowers closeup

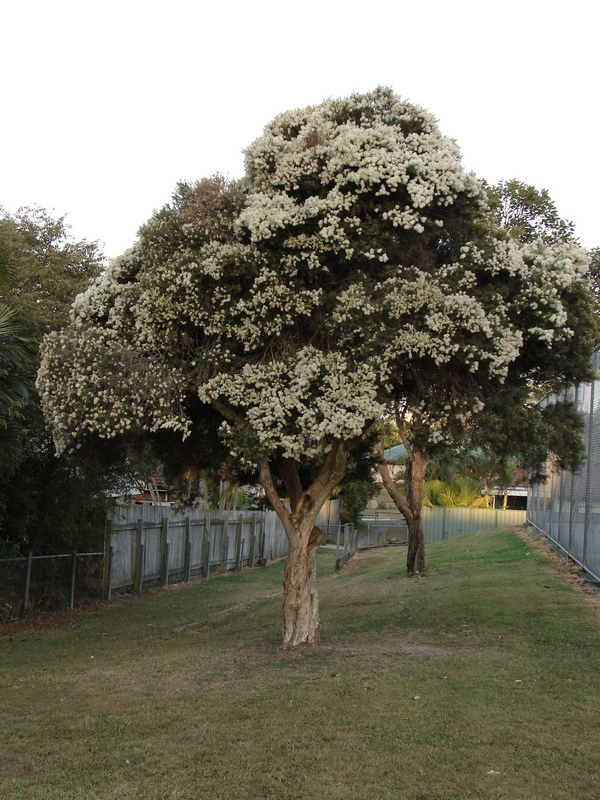
Tree blooming

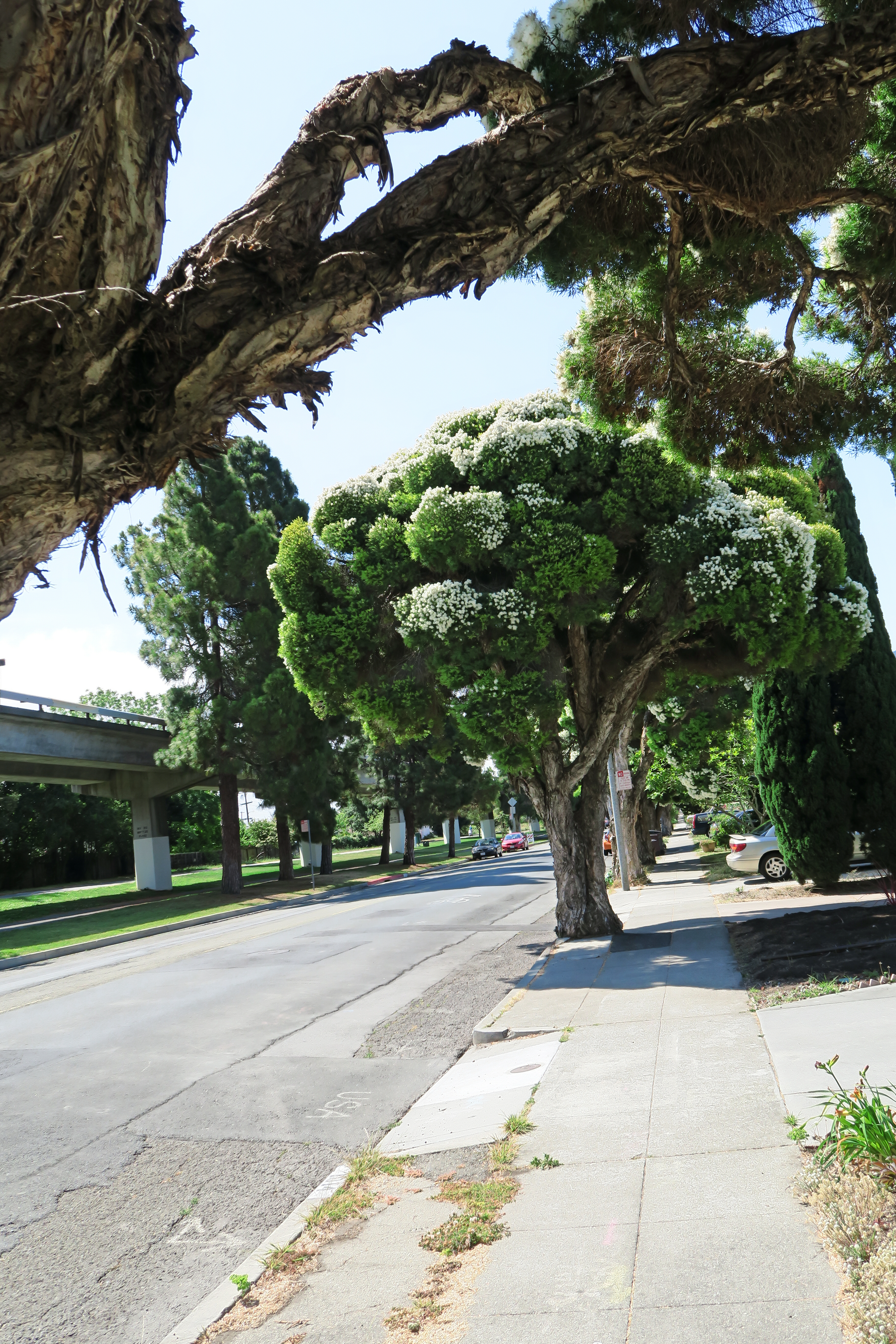
Flowers emerging

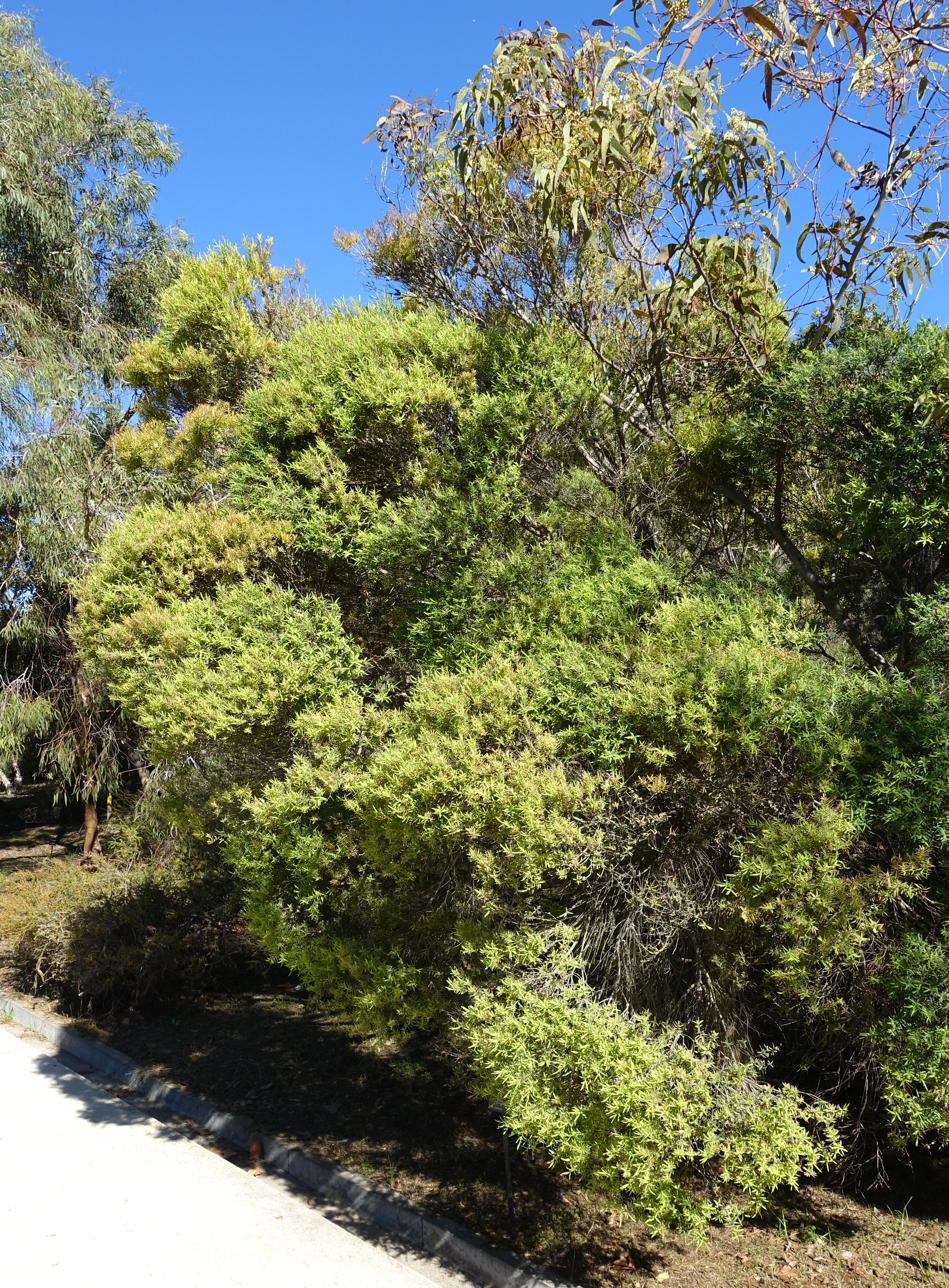
In autumn

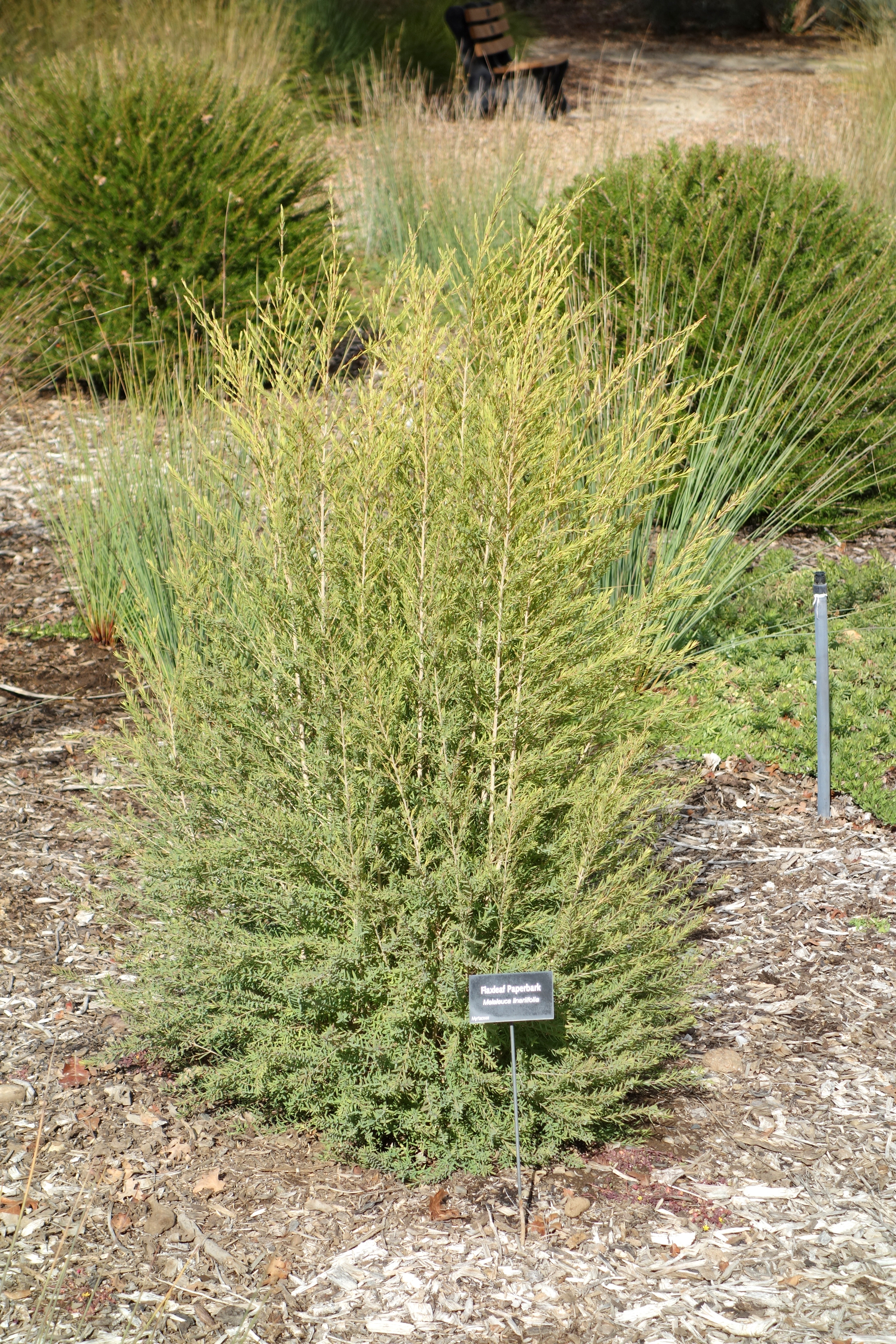
A young specimen

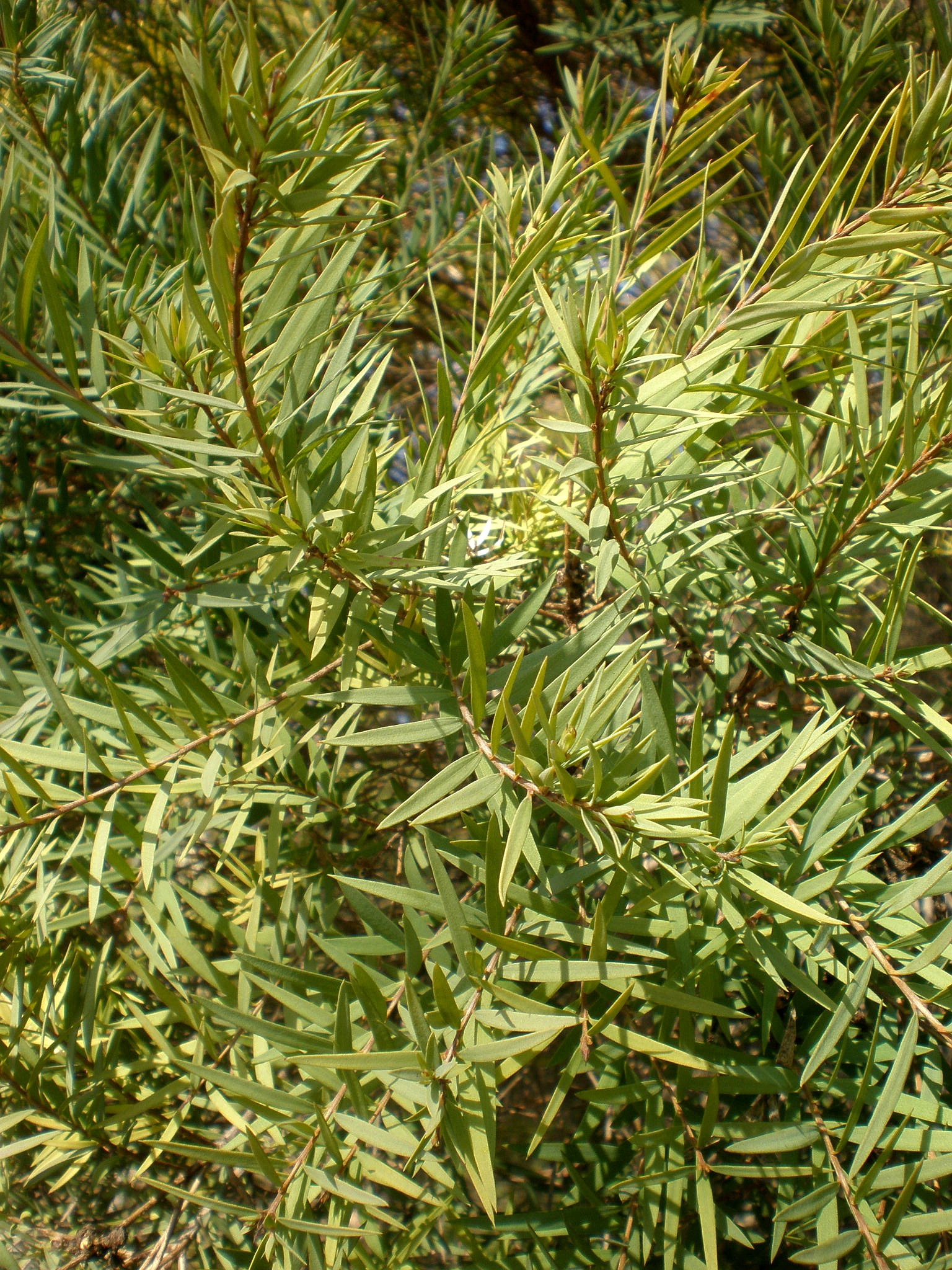
Its narrow, spiky leaves.

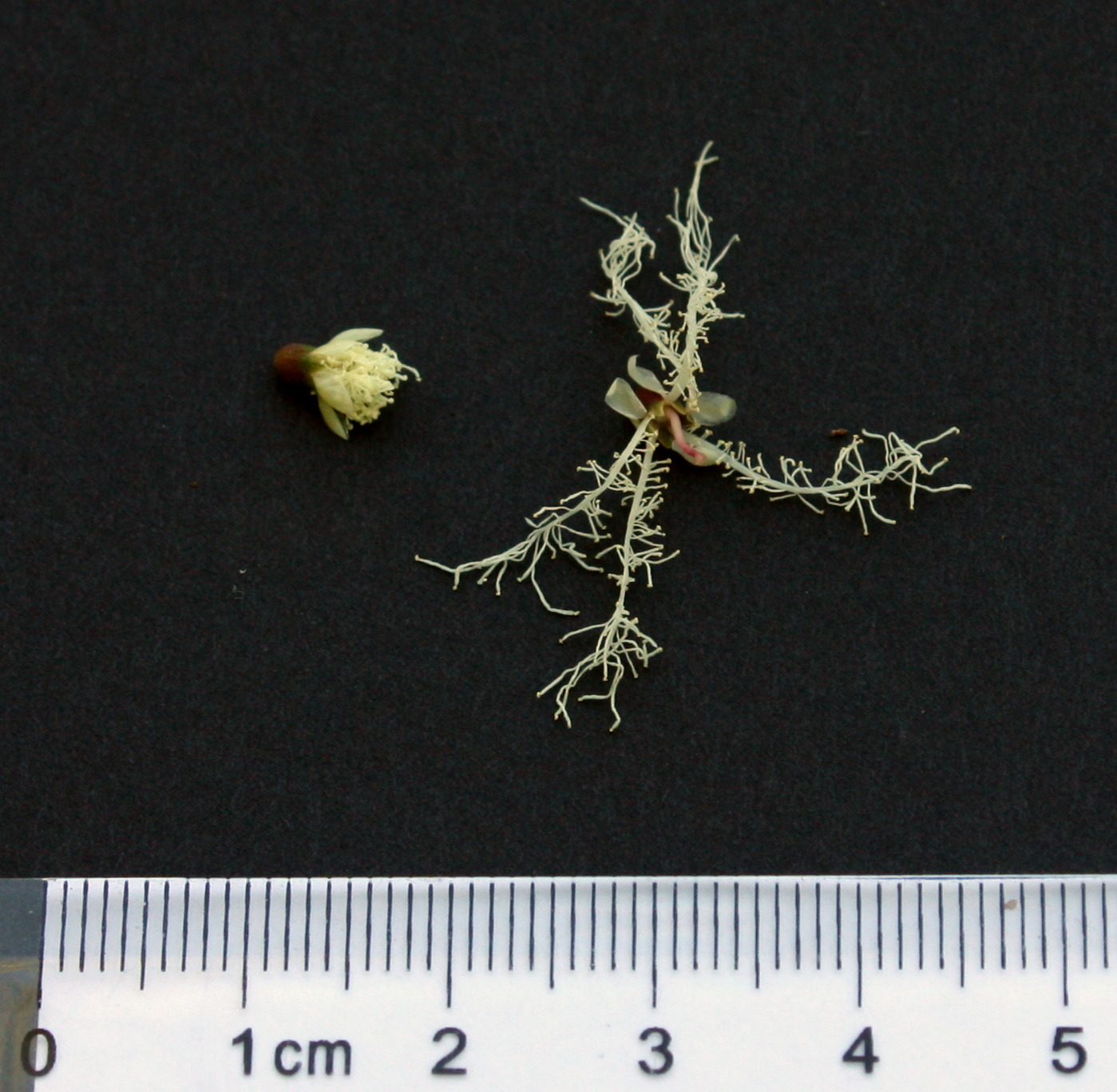
Separate florets removed from the inflorescence, showing long stamens

== See also ==
- Melaleuca decora, similar looking tree in the same genus
