= Terpinene =

Terpinenes
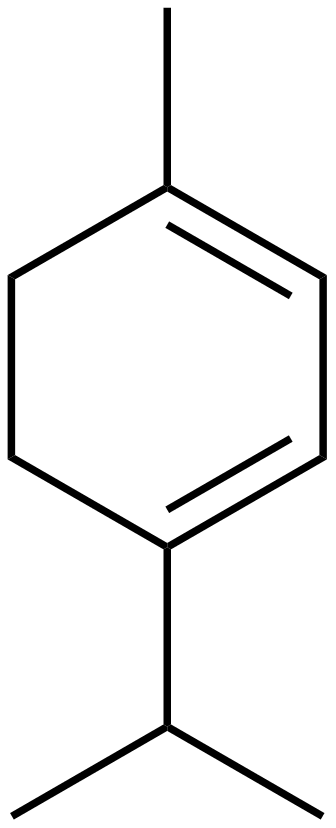
α-Terpinene
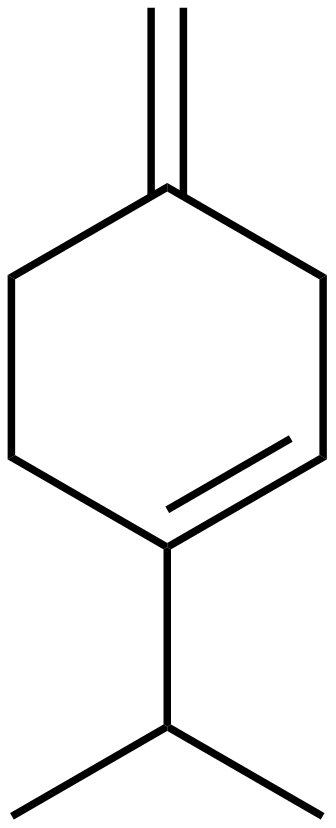
β-Terpinene
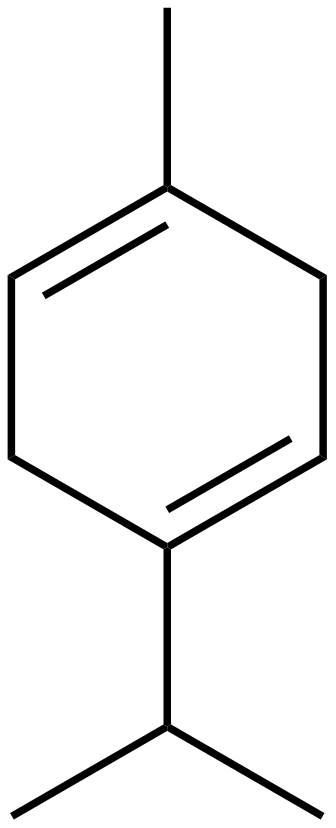
γ-Terpinene
δ-Terpinene
(terpinolene)

Names
- IUPAC names α: 4-Methyl-1-(1-methylethyl)-1,3-cyclohexadiene β: 4-Methylene-1-(1-methylethyl)cyclohexene γ: 4-Methyl-1-(1-methylethyl)-1,4-cyclohexadiene δ: 1-Methyl-4-(propan-2-ylidene)cyclohex-1-ene

Identifiers
CAS Number	(α): 99-86-5; (β): 99-84-3; (γ): 99-85-4; (δ): 586-62-9
3D model (JSmol)	(α): Interactive image; (β): Interactive image; (γ): Interactive image; (δ): Interactive image
ChEBI	(α): CHEBI:10334; (β): CHEBI:59159; (γ): CHEBI:10577; (δ): CHEBI:9457
ChemSpider	(α): 7182; (β): 60205; (γ): 7181
ECHA InfoCard	100.029.440
EC Number	(α): 202-795-1; (β): 202-793-0; (γ): 202-794-6; (δ): 209-578-0
KEGG	(α): C09898; (γ): C09900; (δ): C06075
PubChem CID	(α): 7462; (β): 66841; (γ): 7461; (δ): 11463
UNII	(α): I24X278AP1; (β): DV74J5RW4Y; (γ): 4YGF4PQP49; (δ): N9830X5KSL
- InChI: InChI=1S/C10H16/c1-8(2)10-6-4-9(3)5-7-10/h6,8H,3-5,7H2,1-2H3 Key: SCWPFSIZUZUCCE-UHFFFAOYSA-N; (β): InChI=1S/C10H16/c1-8(2)10-6-4-9(3)5-7-10/h6,8H,3-5,7H2,1-2H3 Key: SCWPFSIZUZUCCE-UHFFFAOYSA-N; (γ): InChI=1S/C10H16/c1-8(2)10-6-4-9(3)5-7-10/h4,7-8H,5-6H2,1-3H3 Key: YKFLAYDHMOASIY-UHFFFAOYSA-N; (δ): InChI=1S/C10H16/c1-8(2)10-6-4-9(3)5-7-10/h4H,5-7H2,1-3H3 Key: MOYAFQVGZZPNRA-UHFFFAOYSA-N
- SMILES: (α): CC1=CC=C(C(C)C)CC1; (β): C=C1CC=C(C(C)C)CC1; (γ): CC1=CCC(C(C)C)=CC1; (δ): C/C(C)=C1CCC(C)=CC/1

Properties
Chemical formula	C_{10}H_{16}
Molar mass	136.238 g·mol^{−1}
Density	α: 0.8375 g/cm^{3} β: 0.838 g/cm^{3} γ: 0.853 g/cm^{3}
Melting point	α: 60-61 °C
Boiling point	α: 173.5-174.8 °C β: 173-174 °C γ: 183 °C
- Except where otherwise noted, data are given for materials in their standard state (at 25 °C [77 °F], 100 kPa). verify (what is ?) Infobox references

The terpinenes are a group of isomeric hydrocarbons that are classified as monoterpenes. They each have the same molecular formula and carbon framework, but they differ in the position of carbon-carbon double bonds. α-Terpinene has been isolated from cardamom and marjoram oils, and from other natural sources. β-Terpinene has no known natural source but has been prepared from sabinene. γ-Terpinene and δ-terpinene (also known as terpinolene) have been isolated from a variety of plant sources. They are all colorless liquids with a turpentine-like odor.

== Production and uses ==
α-Terpinene is produced industrially by acid-catalyzed rearrangement of α-pinene. It has perfume and flavoring properties but is mainly used to confer pleasant odor to industrial fluids. Hydrogenation gives the saturated derivative p-menthane.

== Biosynthesis of α-terpinene ==
Biosynthetic pathway to alpha-terpinene from geranyl pyrophosphate.

The biosynthesis of α-terpinene and other terpenoids starts with the isomerization of geranyl pyrophosphate to linalyl pyrophosphate (LPP). LPP then forms a resonance-stabilized cation by loss of the pyrophosphate group. Cyclization is then completed thanks to this more favorable stereochemistry of the LPP cation, yielding a terpinyl cation. Finally, a 1,2-hydride shift via a Wagner-Meerwein rearrangement produces the terpinen-4-yl cation. It is the loss of a hydrogen from this cation that generates α-terpinene.

== Plants that produce terpinene ==
- Cuminum cyminum
- Melaleuca alternifolia
- Cannabis
- Origanum syriacum
- Coriandrum sativum
- Monarda fistulosa
