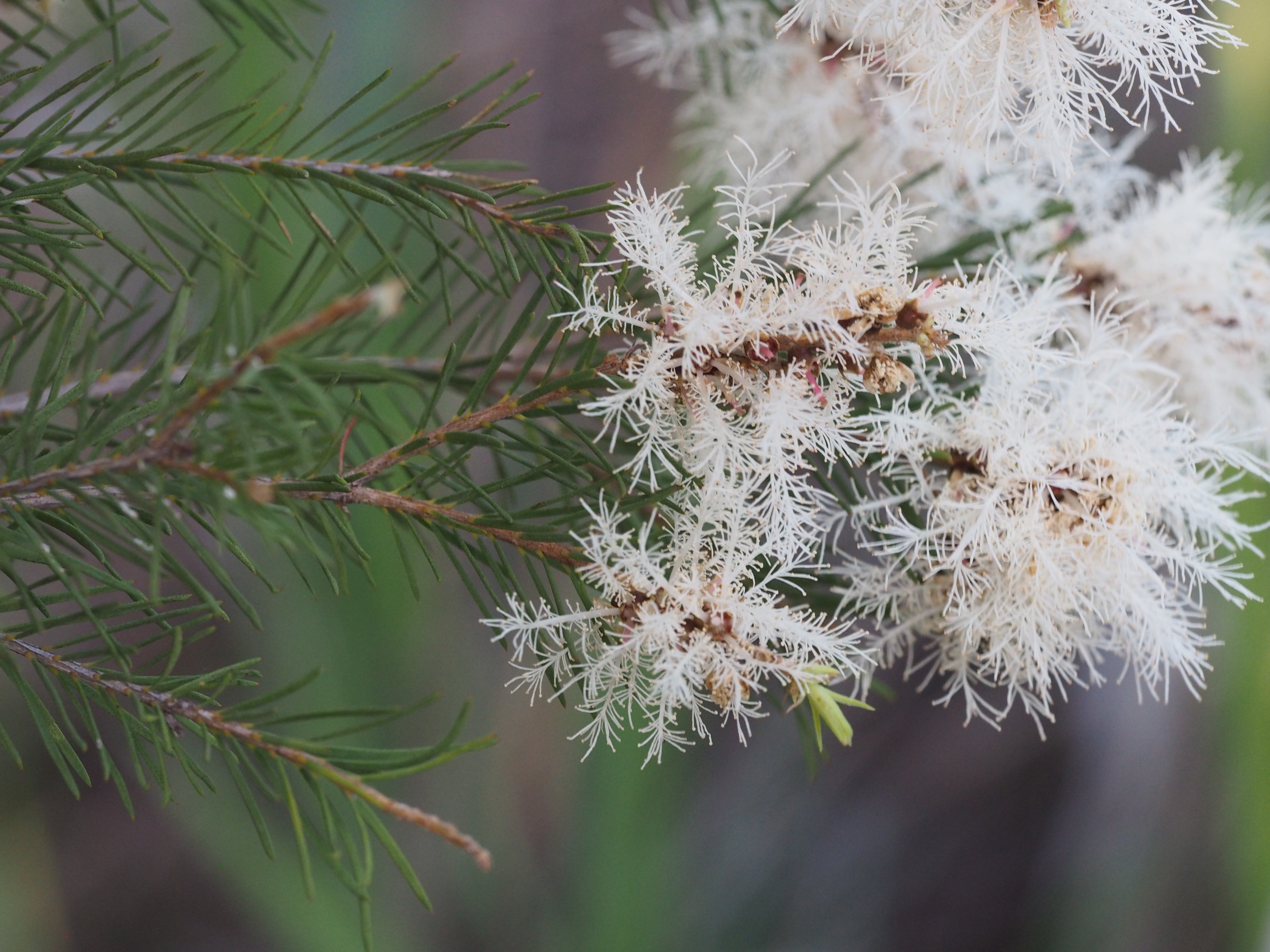

Scientific classification
- Kingdom: Plantae
- Clade: Tracheophytes
- Clade: Angiosperms
- Clade: Eudicots
- Clade: Rosids
- Order: Myrtales
- Family: Myrtaceae
- Genus: Melaleuca
- Species: M. alternifolia

Binomial name
- Melaleuca alternifolia (Maiden & Betche) Cheel

Synonyms
- Melaleuca linariifolia var. alternifolia Maiden & Betche

= Melaleuca alternifolia =

Tea tree

Species of tree in the myrtle family

Melaleuca alternifolia, commonly known as tea tree, is a species of tree or tall shrub in the myrtle family, Myrtaceae. Endemic to Australia, it occurs in southeast Queensland and the north coast and adjacent ranges of New South Wales where it grows along streams and on swampy flats, and is often the dominant species where it occurs.

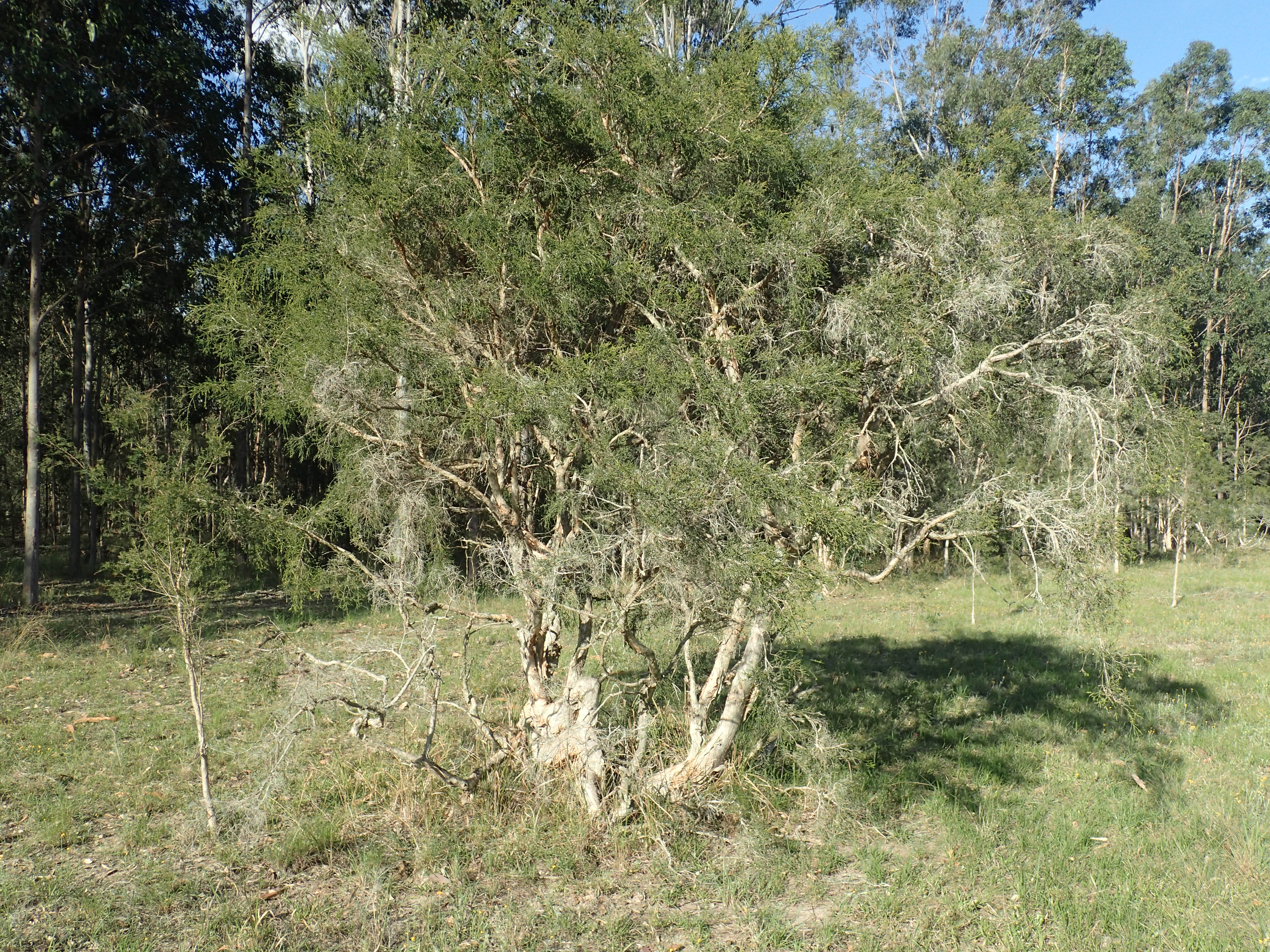
Habit near Casino

== Description ==
Melaleuca alternifolia is a small tree that can grow to about 7 m (20 ft) with a bushy crown and whitish, papery bark. The leaves are arranged alternately, sometimes scattered or whorled. The leaves are smooth, soft, linear in shape, 10–35 mm (0.4–1 in) long, and 1 mm (0.04 in) wide. They are also rich in oil with the glands prominent.

Flowers occur in white or cream-colored masses of spikes 3–5 cm (1–2 in) long over a short period, mostly spring to early summer, and give the tree an appearance of looking fluffy. The small, woody, cup-shaped fruit, 2–3 mm (0.08–0.1 in) in diameter, are scattered along the branches.

== Taxonomy and naming ==
This species was first formally described in 1905 by Joseph Maiden and Ernst Betche and given the name Melaleuca linariifolia var. alternifolia in the Proceedings of the Linnean Society of New South Wales. In 1925, Edwin Cheel raised the variety to species status as Melaleuca alternifolia. The specific epithet (alternifolia) is derived from the Latin alternus meaning "alternate" and folium meaning "leaf", referring to the leaf arrangement.

== Distribution and habitat ==
Melaleuca alternifolia is endemic to Australia and is found from the Grafton district in New South Wales as far inland as Stroud and in coastal districts north to Maryborough in Queensland. It grows along streams and in swampy places.

== Uses ==
=== Horticulture ===
This species grows well in a wide range of soils and climates. It prefers moist, but well-drained soils and full sun.

=== Traditional medicine and potential toxicity ===
Tea tree has been used as a folk medicine treatment among Indigenous Australians of eastern inland areas who use tea trees by inhaling the oils from the crushed leaves to treat coughs and colds. They also sprinkle leaves on wounds, after which a poultice is applied. In addition, tea tree leaves are soaked to make an infusion to treat sore throats or skin ailments.

Characteristic of the myrtle family Myrtaceae, it is used to distill essential oil. It is the primary species for commercial production of tea tree oil (melaleuca oil), a topical treatment. Tea tree oil is commonly used as a treatment for acne, although evidence is limited that it is effective for this purpose.

If ingested, tea tree oil is toxic with serious side effects, including coma, and may cause skin irritation if used topically in high concentrations. As of 2006, no deaths were reported in the medical literature.

=== Gallery ===
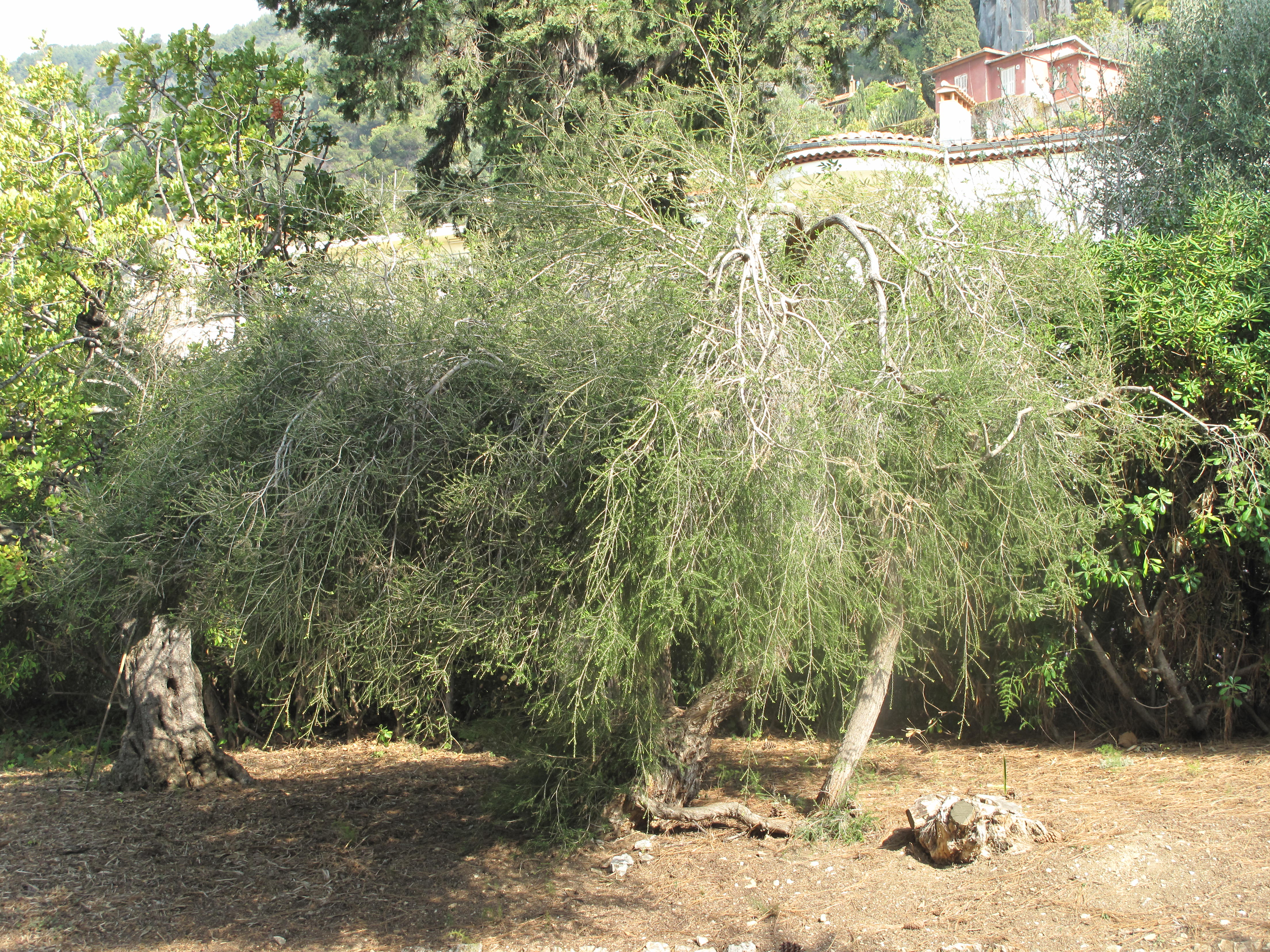
M. alternifolia (cultivated) growing in Menton, France

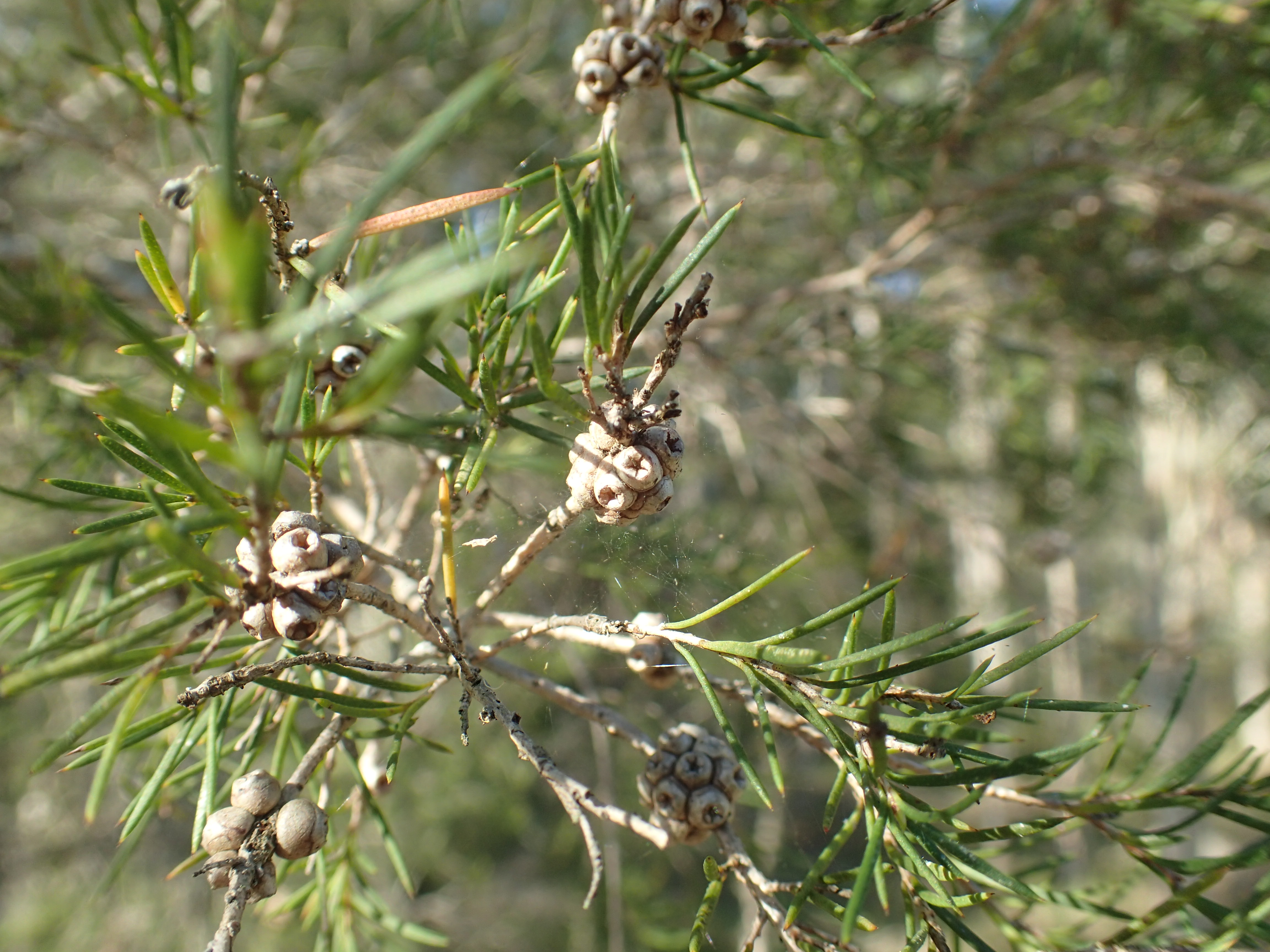
M. alternifolia fruits

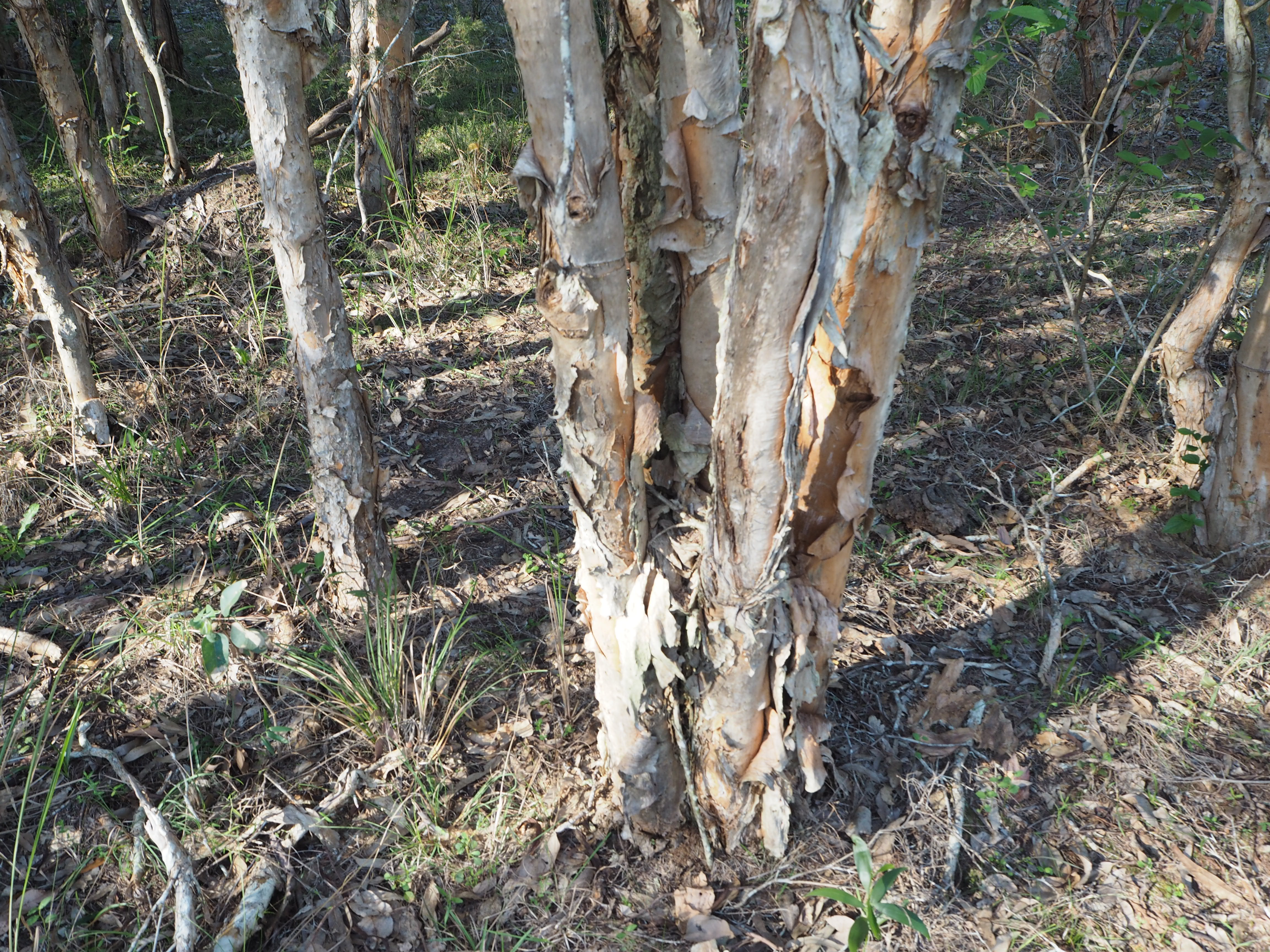
M. alternifolia bark

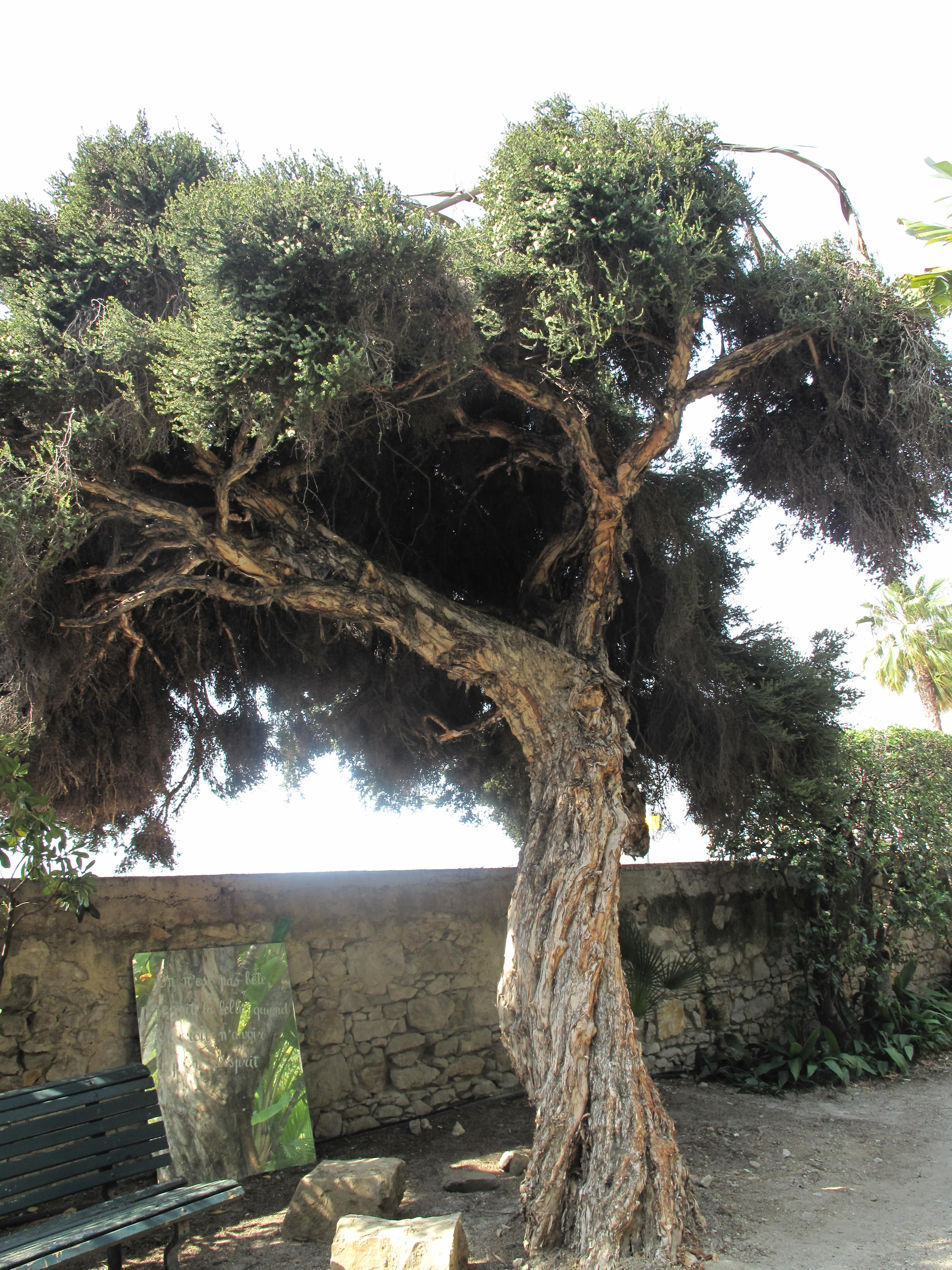
M. alternifolia tree

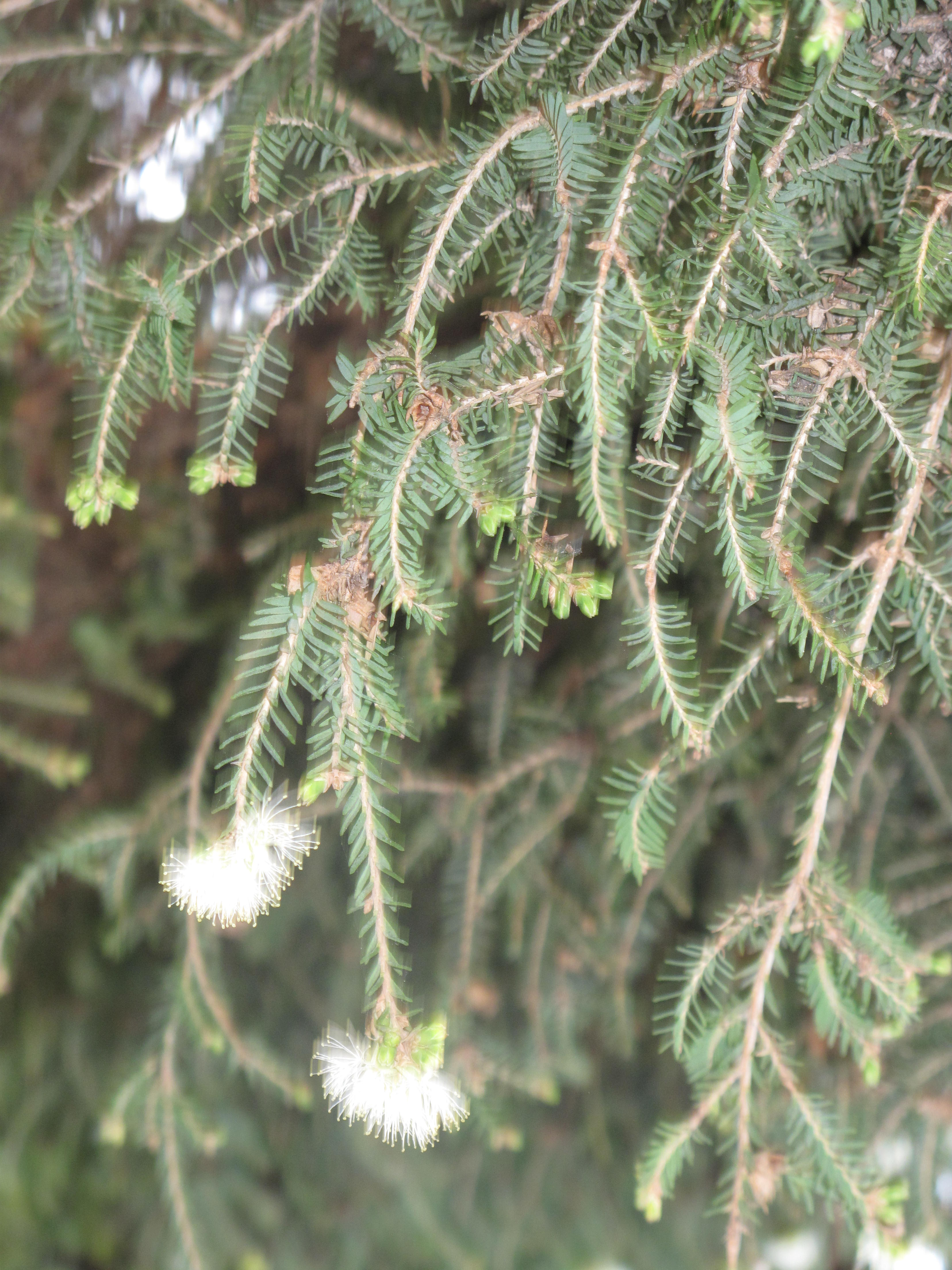
M. alternifolia flowers
