= C10H16O =

The molecular formula C_{10}H_{16}O (molar mass: 152.24 g/mol) may refer to:

- Camphor
- Carveol
- Citral, or the related neral or gerania
- β-Cyclocitral
- (E,E)-2,4-Decadienal
- Fenchone
- (S)-Ipsdienol
- Myrtenol
- Perillyl alcohol
- Pinocarveol
- Piperitone
- Pulegone
- Thujone
- Verbenol
