= Persian turpentine tree =

The Persian turpentine tree may refer to:

- Pistacia eurycarpa
- Pistacia atlantica
