= Simplimorpha promissa =

Scientific classification
- Domain: Eukaryota
- Kingdom: Animalia
- Phylum: Arthropoda
- Class: Insecta
- Order: Lepidoptera
- Family: Nepticulidae
- Genus: Simplimorpha
- Species: S. promissa

Binomial name
- Simplimorpha promissa (Staudinger, 1870)

Synonyms
- Nepticula promissa Staudinger, 1871; Stigmella promissa Staudinger, 1871; Nepticula robiniella Gustafsson, 1973

Species of moth

Simplimorpha promissa is a moth of the family Nepticulidae. It is widely distributed in southern Europe with the northern limit running approximately along the southern slopes of the Alps and along the Danube.

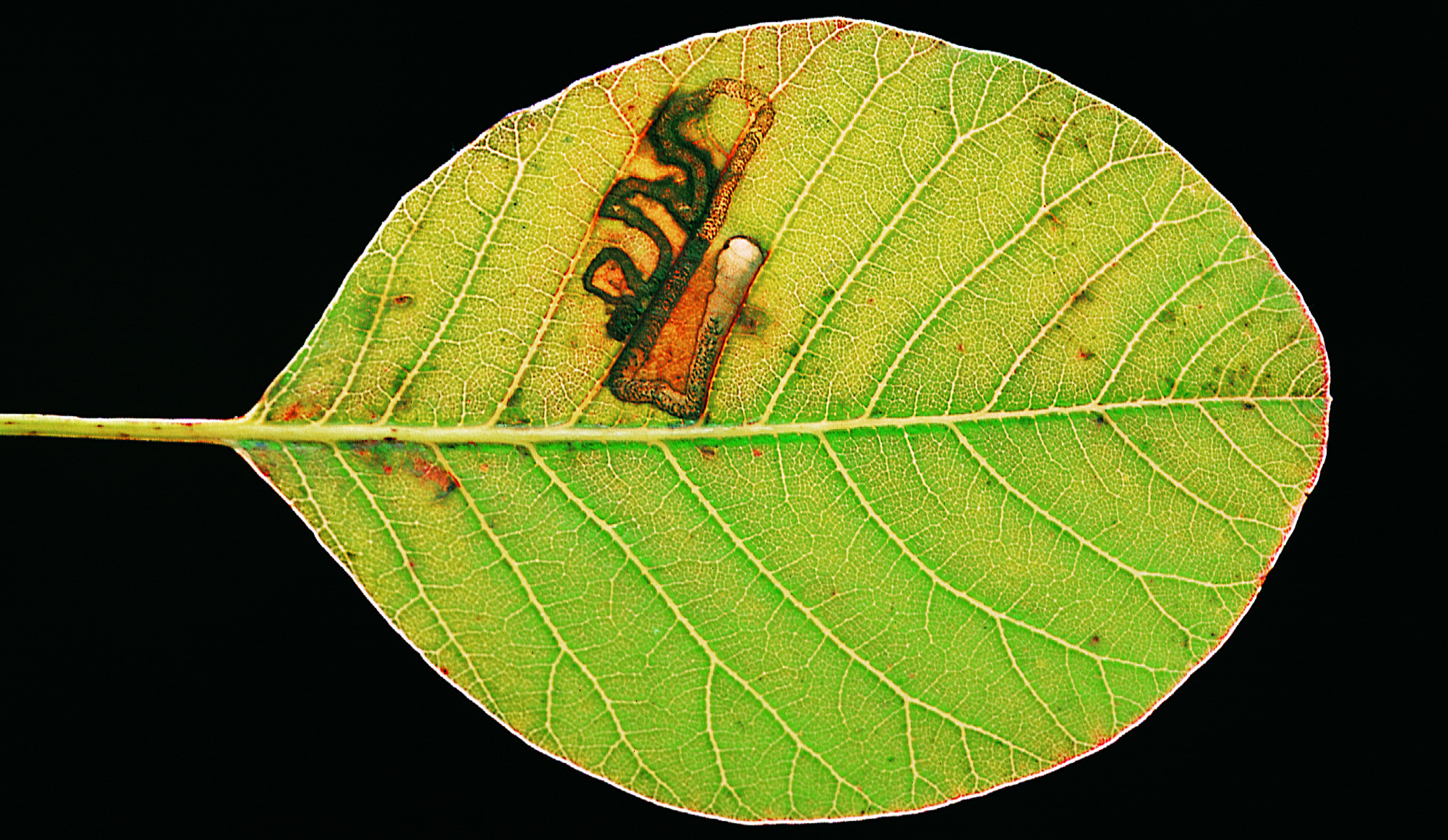
Simplimorpha promissa mine

The wingspan is 4-4.5 mm. There are almost continuous generations in the Mediterranean area, but there are two to three generations in places where only the deciduous Cotinus occurs.

The larvae feed on Cotinus coggyria, Pistacia atlantica, Pistacia khinjuk, Pistacia lentiscus, Pistacia terebinthus, Pistacia vera and Rhus coriaria. They mine the leaves of their host plant.
