= Caloptilia braccatella =

Scientific classification
- Domain: Eukaryota
- Kingdom: Animalia
- Phylum: Arthropoda
- Class: Insecta
- Order: Lepidoptera
- Family: Gracillariidae
- Genus: Caloptilia
- Species: C. braccatella

Binomial name
- Caloptilia braccatella (Staudinger, 1870)

Synonyms
- Gracilaria braccatella Staudinger, 1870

Species of moth

Caloptilia braccatella is a moth of the family Gracillariidae. It is known from Rhodes, Italy, Turkey and the European part of Russia.

The larvae feed on Pistacia atlantica.
