= List of plants known as zebrawood =

Zebrawood refers to several trees and the wood derived from them, including:

- Astronium fraxinifolium
- Brachystegia spiciformis
- Centrolobium robustum
- Guettarda speciosa
- Pistacia integerrima, native to Asia
