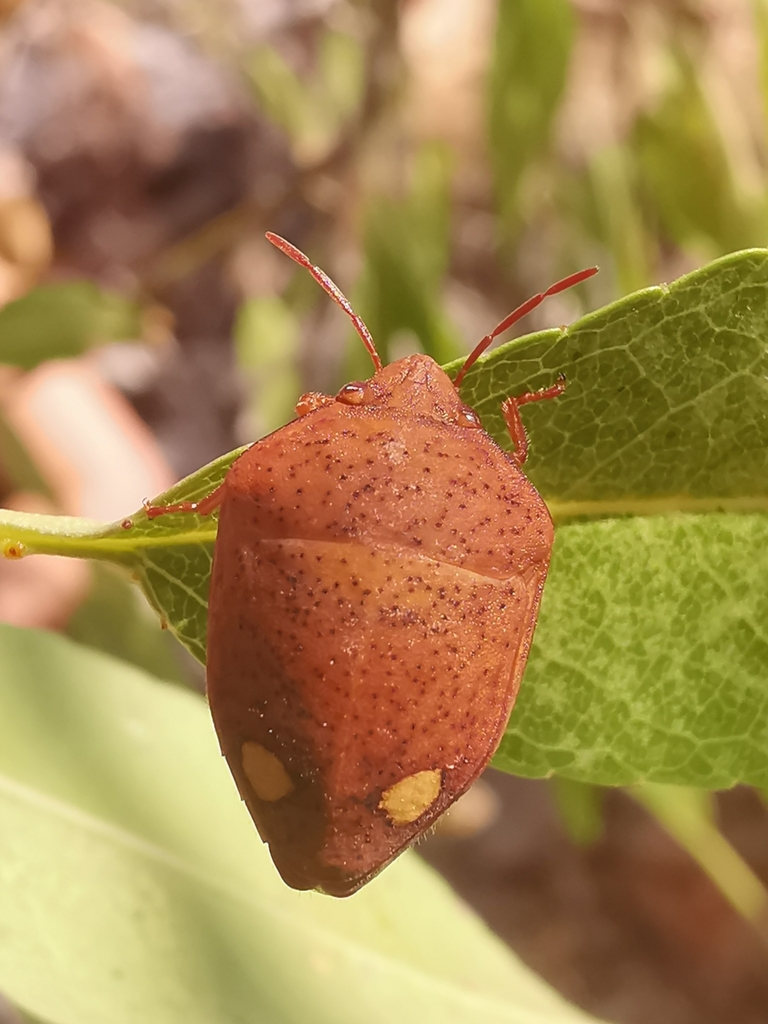
- Solenosthedium bilunatum on a leaf in Greece

Scientific classification
- Domain: Eukaryota
- Kingdom: Animalia
- Phylum: Arthropoda
- Class: Insecta
- Order: Hemiptera
- Suborder: Heteroptera
- Family: Scutelleridae
- Genus: Solenosthedium
- Species: S. bilunatum

Binomial name
- Solenosthedium bilunatum Lefebvre, 1827

Synonyms
- Scutellera bilunata Lefebvre, 1827

= Solenosthedium bilunatum =

Species of jewel bug

Solenosthedium bilunatum is a species of jewel bug in the subfamily Elvisurinae. It is the only species of its subfamily found in Europe, and, measuring 12 to 16 millimetres (0.47 to 0.63 in), they are somewhat big for their group.

== Description ==
The scutellum completely covers the abdomen of these jewel bugs, having two oval-shaped, yellow-colored, and big spots on it, and, the body of S. bilunatum can be anywhere from light to reddish-brown.

== Diet ==
S. bilunatum is known to feed on Schinus molle, Arbutus unedo, Cydonia oblonga and species of the genus Pistacia.

== Distribution ==
Having a Mediterranean distribution, you can commonly find S. bilunatum in North Africa and Sicily. It is also found in various other locations such as Greece, Lebanon and Croatia.
