= C11H18O =

The molecular formula C_{11}H_{18}O (molar mass: 166.26 g/mol, exact mass: 166.1358 u) may refer to:

- Dihydrojasmone
- Pomarose
- Nopol
