= Alpha-pinene monooxygenase =

Class of enzymes

Identifiers
- EC no.: 1.14.13.155

Databases
- IntEnz: IntEnz view
- BRENDA: BRENDA entry
- ExPASy: NiceZyme view
- KEGG: KEGG entry
- MetaCyc: metabolic pathway
- PRIAM: profile
- PDB structures: RCSB PDB PDBe PDBsum
Search
- PMC: articles
- PubMed: articles
- NCBI: proteins

Alpha-pinene monooxygenase (EC 1.14.13.155) is an enzyme with systematic name (-)-alpha-pinene,NADH:oxygen oxidoreductase. This enzyme catalyses the following chemical reaction

(-)-alpha-pinene + NADH + H^{+} + O_{2} $\rightleftharpoons$ alpha-pinene oxide + NAD^{+} + H_{2}O

Alpha-pinene monooxygenase takes part in catabolism of alpha-pinene.
