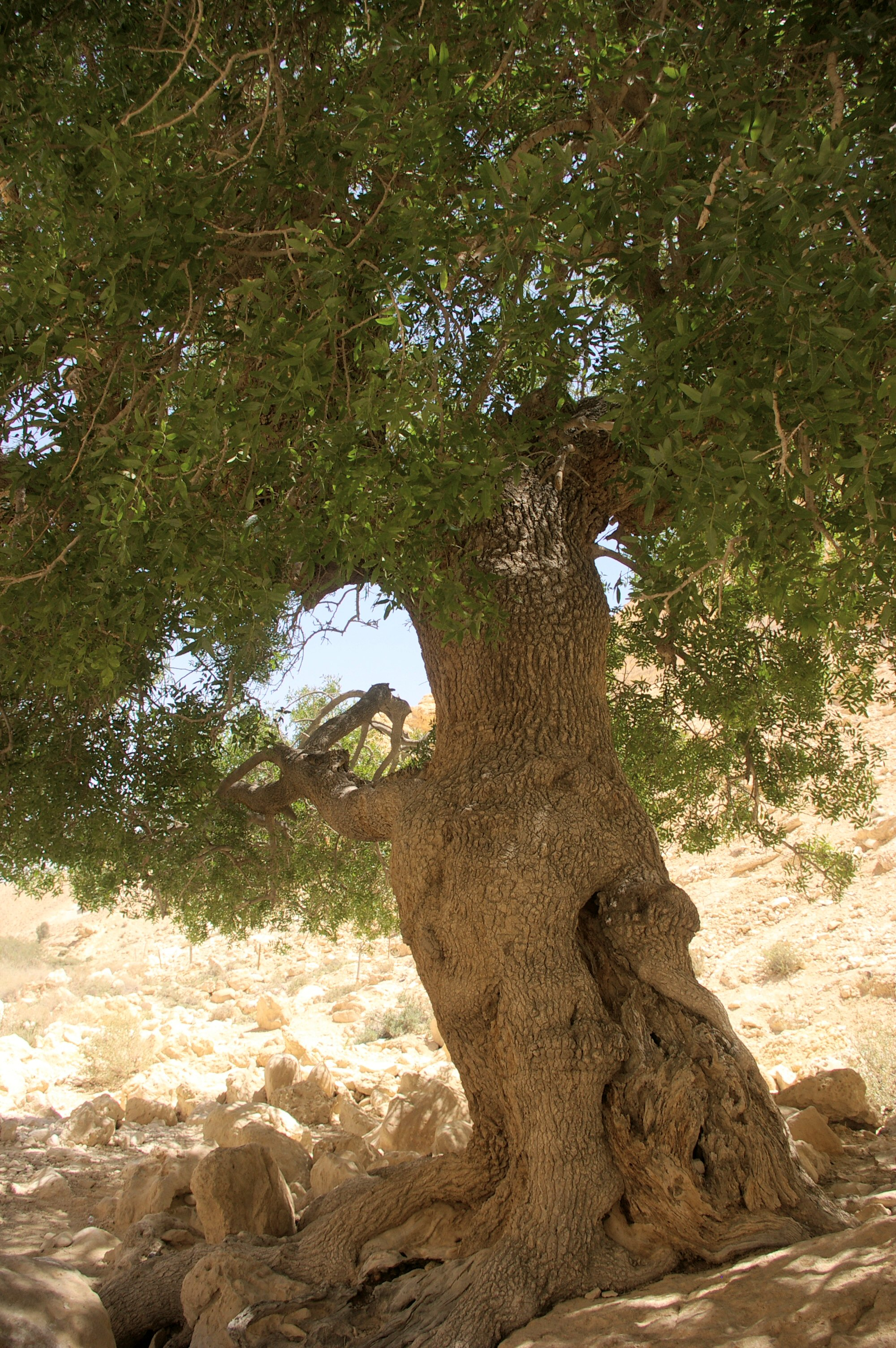

Conservation status
- Near Threatened (IUCN 3.1)

Scientific classification
- Kingdom: Plantae
- Clade: Tracheophytes
- Clade: Angiosperms
- Clade: Eudicots
- Clade: Rosids
- Order: Sapindales
- Family: Anacardiaceae
- Genus: Pistacia
- Species: P. atlantica

Binomial name
- Pistacia atlantica Desf.
- Distribution

Synonyms
- Pistacia mutica Fisch. & C.A.Mey.; Terebinthus atlanticus (Desf.) Dum.Cours.

= Pistacia atlantica =

Species of plant

Pistacia atlantica is a species of pistachio tree known by the English common names Mt. Atlas mastic tree, Mount Atlas pistachio, Atlantic pistachio, wild pistachio, turpentine tree and Atlantic terebinth. P. atlantica has three subspecies or varieties which have been described as atlantica, cabulica, and mutica. According to molecular phylogenetic studies, P. atlantica subsp. kurdica is actually a separate species, Pistacia eurycarpa.

== Names ==
In Kurdish it is called Qazwan, Wanataq and bana. In Tamazight, it is known as Tijjeɣt. In the Canary Islands it is known as Almacigo, and in Arabic it is called بطم (buṭm or buṭum). In southern Iran, in Bandar-Abbas in Hormozgān Province, it is called kasoudang and in Bushehr it is called kolkhong. In Turkey it is commonly known as melengiç. In Kurdish the tree is called darwan or daraban, and the seed is called qezwan or jajig (قەزوان_جاجگ). In Pashto it is called Shanna. And in Birhavi/Balochi it is called Gowan. In Hebrew it is called Elah Atlantit. In Malta, it is known as Deru tal-Atlantiku, Pistaċċa bagħla.

== Description ==
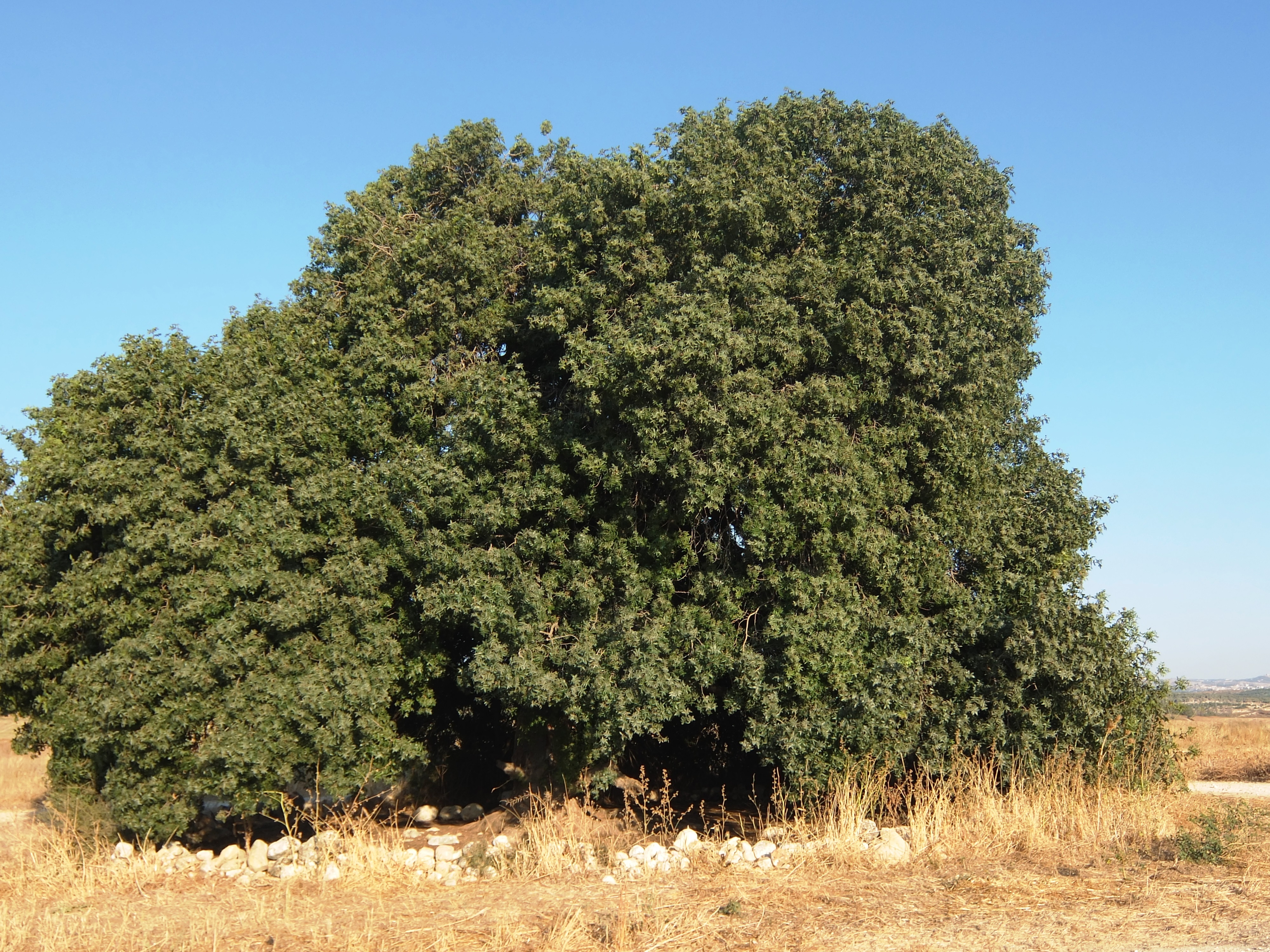
Pistacia atlantica in Elah valley

Pistacia atlantica is a deciduous tree growing up to 7 m (23 ft) tall with branches spreading and growing erect to form a dense crown. The trunk is stout and covered in fissured bark. Old trees may have trunks measuring 2 m (6 ft 7 in) in diameter; it may take 200 years for a tree to reach 1 m (3 ft 3 in) wide. The leaves are pinnate, each with seven to 9 lance-shaped leaflets.

The leaves and branches often have galls when the tree is infested with gall-producing species of aphids, including Pemphigus utricularis, Slavum wertheimae, and Forda riccobonii.

The tree is dioecious with male and female trees producing different types of flowers. Both types are small and greenish and fall away quickly. Monoecious and hermaphrodite trees have been seen, but are unusual. The oblong, fleshy, oily fruit borne by the female tree is 6 to 8 mm (0.24 to 0.31 in) long and pink in color, ripening to blue. The tree grows slowly, and can reach 1000 years old. It has broken bark with ashen gray color. Older branches have the same design, fractured and ash color, which gives the tree a grizzled look. The leaves are oval, almost sessile, shining above, and dark green, with seven to 9 leaflets, imparipinnate with petioles a little winged, flowers in racemes lax, the male and female on different trees.

The flowers are unisexual, small, discreet green, thick as pea fruit, then changing to reddish blue. In colder areas the leaves in May check and fall in November. Though dioecious, in some communities males dominate the female specimens in number. It grows in oak woodlands and oak sclerophyllus. The fruits ripen from July to October, starting to bear fruit at the age of eight to 10 years, with abundant fruit after two to three years.

== Distribution ==
It is native to a section of Eurasia from North Africa to the Iranian Plateau, where it was once common. Because other trees were rare, it was the only good source of wood and was overharvested, reducing its current distribution. It is a common tree in mountain forests in Iran, and it is "characteristic" of the landscape in parts of Algeria outside the Sahara.

The almacigo is a tree that extends from the North Africa and found in thermophilous forests, up to 600 m altitude. It is one of the few deciduous species native to the Canary archipelago. It is native of Eurasia, the Iranian Plateau, to northern Africa. Azerbaijan (Soltanbud forest)

In the Crimea, where it is a protected species, it is the only native species of the genus Pistacia.

== Uses ==
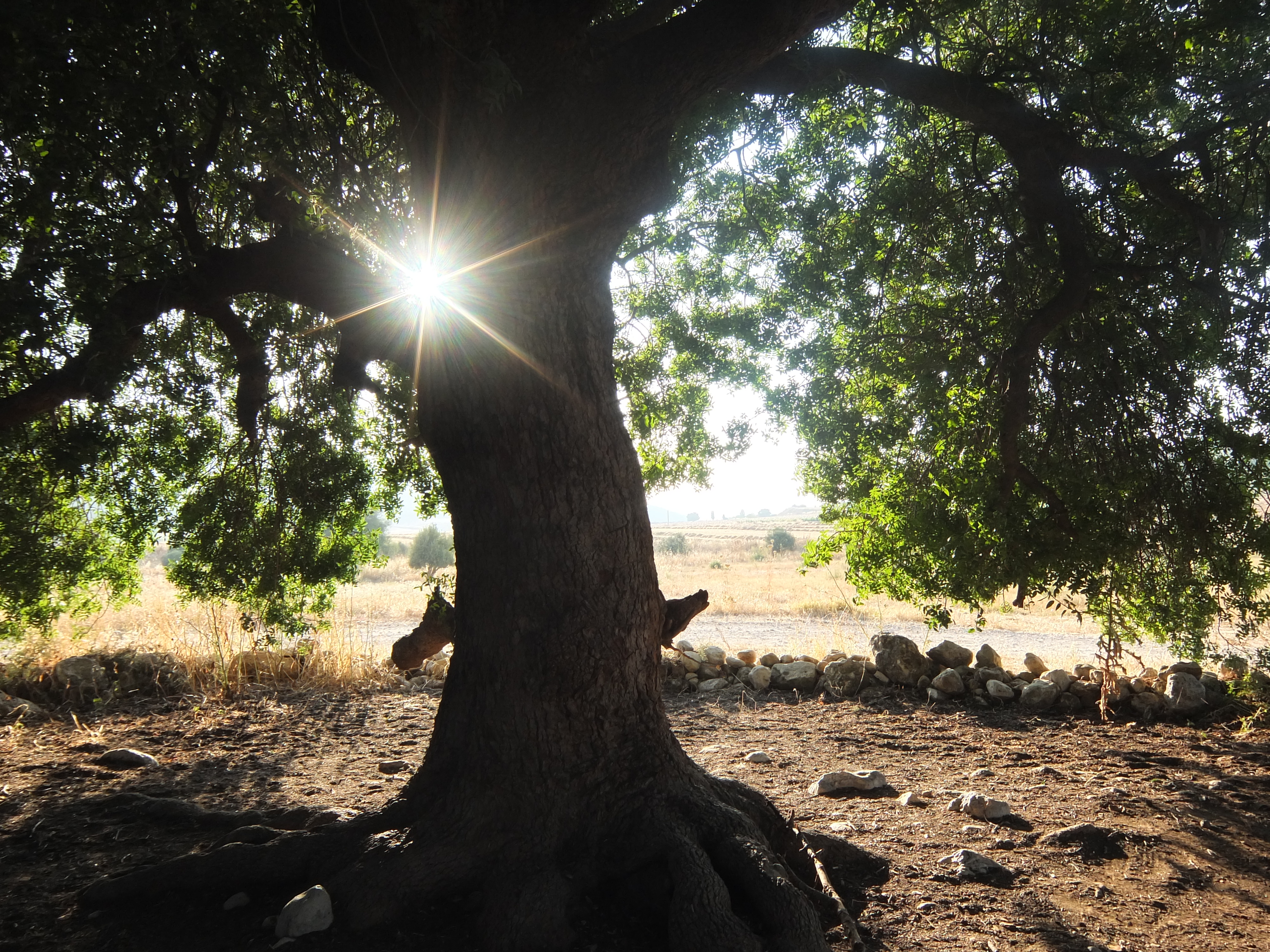
Pistacia atlantica in sunlight

There are many uses for this plant. This wild pistachio is the most economically important tree in many parts of the Kurdish regions, including the Zagros Mountains, where it is managed as a valuable forest tree. The resin and fruit oil were historically used for a variety of medicinal purposes. The resin, known in Iran as saqez, is still an important commodity.

Another important use is to combat soil erosion. It strengthens the soil, and is used for reforestation of arid and steep slopes and against landslides. It is stronger than Pistacia terebinthus, where it is used as rootstock in Ukraine and the United States for growing Pistacia vera, but resists frost better than P. terebinthus.

The resin is used to manufacture alcohol and lacquer. Its essential oils are used in perfume industry. The leaves are rich in tannins, up to 20% in the galls caused by an aphid parasite, used as the raw material for tanning in the leather industry. The sap is dried and used as incense, and its smoke releases a pleasant smell to the local environment for celebrations and religious ceremonies, as "incense".

=== Food ===
The pistachio fruits are a food source in the area, but the more commonly cultivated pistachio tree P. vera is more valuable for food production. The seeds, like pistachio, are edible oil seeds, like nuts, and contain up to 60% fat. Candy made with P. atlantica in Turkish are called tsukpi pistachio. Sometimes, the immature fruit is harvested and eaten with sour milk. The plant contains a resin, used as chewing gum in Kevan, Turkey, where it is called kevove rubber tree.

The resin of the tree is called Cyprus turpentine or Cyprus balsam and used to make chewing gum in Cyprus, in the area of Paphos. It is known as "Paphos Gum," or "Paphitiki Pissa" (Παφίτικη Πίσσα, Πίσσα Παφίτικη) in Cypriot Greek. It has been reported to have significant antimicrobial and antifungal activity. Twenty-six compounds in hexane extract were identified. The major compounds were α-pinene 57.06%, β-pinene 9.83%, trans-pinocarveol 2.95%, trans-Verbenol 3.97%, α-Phellandren-8-ol 3.81%.

It is used in a food in Fars province in Iran, named "OuBanneh" (اوبنه).

The raw fruits of the wild pistachio are not favored as food and are said to taste like turpentine. They are about 45% oil.

The Jewish source The Mishnah, compiled in 200 CE in Tzippori and Beit Shearim, Israel, mentions that the roots of the tree were also consumed, but only after they were pickled in salt or vinegar.

=== Cultivation ===
Pistacia atlantica is planted as an ornamental shadebearing and drought-tolerant landscape tree in gardens and parks. In California it is imported to use as rootstock for cultivated pistachio trees (Pistacia vera). Both introductions have led to its escape and current status as an occasional invasive species in California.

=== References in Ancient Texts ===
Both the Book of Genesis and Chronicles refer to the tree, but it is mentioned under the general Hebrew term Elah, so it is difficult to know if the reference is to a terebinth or Pistacia atlantica. It is also referred to in the Mishnah, in regard to its shoots.

== See also ==
- Pistacia eurycarpa, used to be P. atlantica subsp. kurdica
- Pistacia lentiscus, the true mastic tree
