= Pistacia malayana =

Conservation status
- Least Concern (IUCN 2.3)

Scientific classification
- Kingdom: Plantae
- Clade: Tracheophytes
- Clade: Angiosperms
- Clade: Eudicots
- Clade: Rosids
- Order: Sapindales
- Family: Anacardiaceae
- Genus: Pistacia
- Species: P. malayana

Binomial name
- Pistacia malayana M.R. Henderson

Species of flowering plant

Pistacia malayana is a species of plant in the family Anacardiaceae. It is endemic to Peninsular Malaysia.
