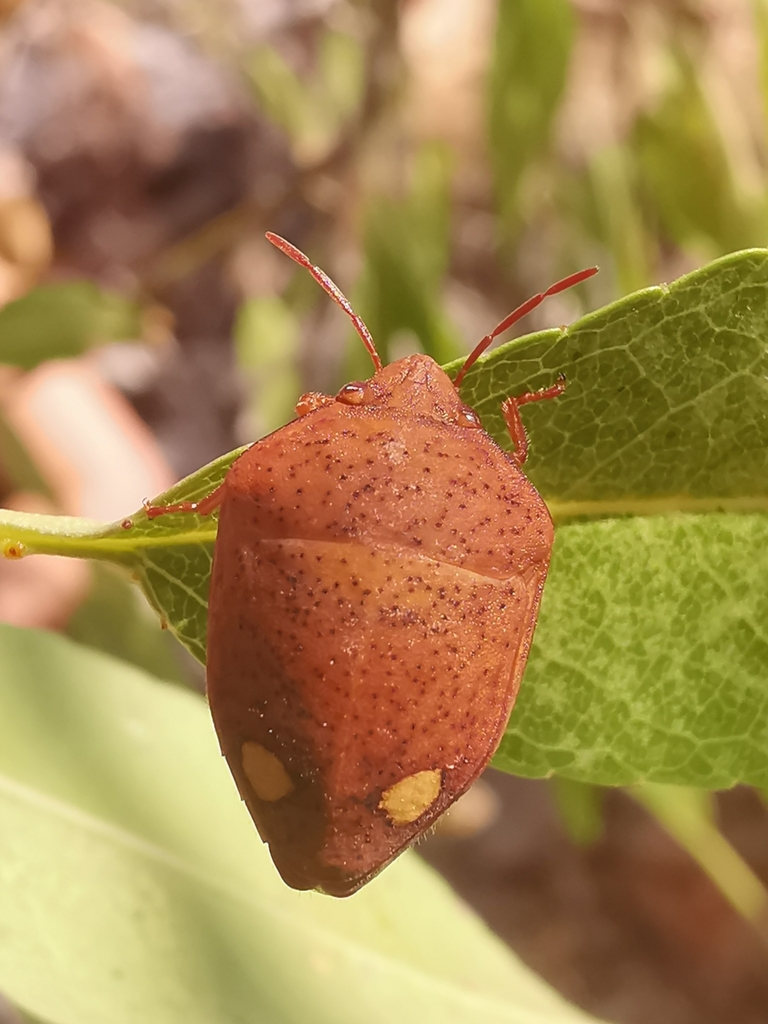
- Solenosthedium bilunatum

Scientific classification
- Domain: Eukaryota
- Kingdom: Animalia
- Phylum: Arthropoda
- Class: Insecta
- Order: Hemiptera
- Suborder: Heteroptera
- Family: Scutelleridae
- Subfamily: Elvisurinae
- Genus: Solenosthedium; Spinola, 1837

Synonyms
- Coeloglossa Germar, 1839; Solenostethium Amyot & Audinet-Serville, 1843 (misspelling)

= Solenosthedium =

Genus of bugs

Solenosthedium is a genus of shield-backed bugs in the subfamily Elvisurinae, erected by Maximilian Spinola in 1837. Species are recorded from Africa, Europe and mainland Asia.

== Species ==
The following are included in BioLib.cz:

1. Solenosthedium bilunatum (Lefebvre, 1827)
2. Solenosthedium chinense Stål, 1854
3. Solenosthedium liligerum (Thunberg, 1783)
4. Solenosthedium lynceum (Fabricius, 1803)
5. Solenosthedium planiusculum Reuter, 1913
6. Solenosthedium rubropunctatum (Guérin-Méneville, 1830)
7. Solenosthedium schultzi Schouteden, 1903
8. Solenosthedium superbum Schouteden, 1908
