= Simplimorpha lanceifoliella =

Scientific classification
- Domain: Eukaryota
- Kingdom: Animalia
- Phylum: Arthropoda
- Class: Insecta
- Order: Lepidoptera
- Family: Nepticulidae
- Genus: Simplimorpha
- Species: S. lanceifoliella

Binomial name
- Simplimorpha lanceifoliella (Vari, 1955)

Synonyms
- Stigmella lanceifoliella Vari, 1955

Species of moth

Simplimorpha lanceifoliella is a moth of the family Nepticulidae first described by Vari in 1955. It is found in southern Africa.

There are several generations per year.

The larvae feed on Anacardiaceae species, including Rhus lancea. They mine the leaves of their host plant.
