= Pistacia chinensis =

Chinese pistache
- Pistacia chinensis with autumn colour

Conservation status
- Least Concern (IUCN 3.1)

Scientific classification
- Kingdom: Plantae
- Clade: Tracheophytes
- Clade: Angiosperms
- Clade: Eudicots
- Clade: Rosids
- Order: Sapindales
- Family: Anacardiaceae
- Genus: Pistacia
- Species: P. chinensis

Binomial name
- Pistacia chinensis Bunge

Synonyms
- Pistacia formosana Matsum.; Pistacia integerrima J. L. Stewart ex Brandis; Pistacia philippinensis Merr. & Rolfe; Rhus argyi H. Lév.; Rhus gummifera H. Lév.

Species of tree

Pistacia chinensis, the Chinese pistache (Chinese: 黄連木; pinyin: huángliánmù), is a small to medium-sized tree in the genus Pistacia in the cashew family Anacardiaceae, native to central and western China. This species is planted as a street tree in temperate areas worldwide due to its attractive fruit and autumn foliage.

== Description ==
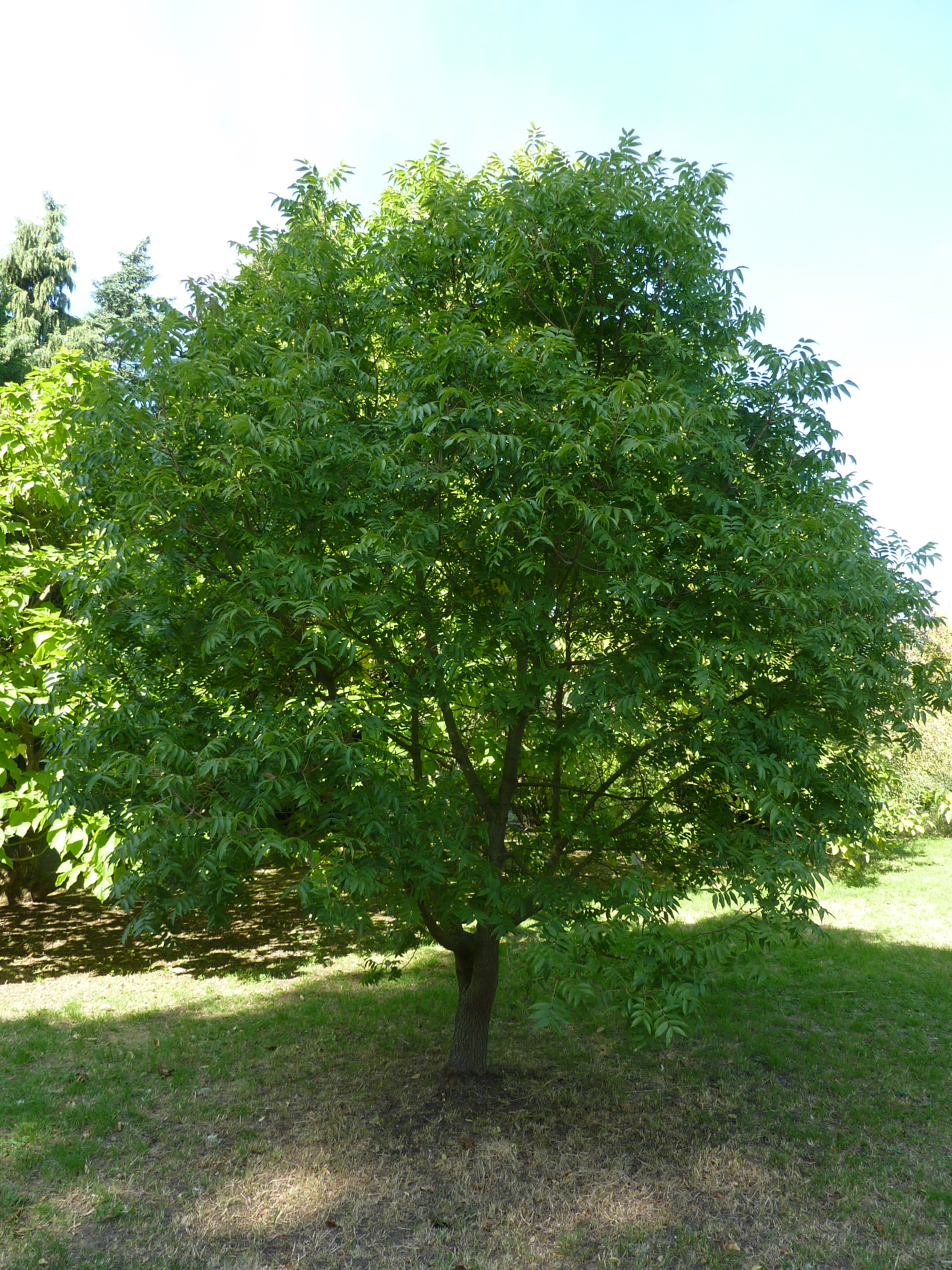
Tree in the summer

It is hardy, can withstand harsh conditions and poor quality soils, and grows up to 20 m (66 ft). The leaves are deciduous, alternate, pinnate, 20–25 cm (7.9–9.8 in) long, with 10 or 12 leaflets, the terminal leaflet usually absent. The flowers are produced in panicles 15–20 cm (5.9–7.9 in) long at the ends of the branches; it is dioecious, with separate male and female plants.

The fruit is a small red drupe, turning blue when ripe, containing a single seed.

== Taxonomy ==
Synonyms include: Pistacia formosana Matsumura; P. philippinensis Merrill & Rolfe; Rhus argyi H. Léveillé; R. gummifera H. Léveillé.

Some botanists merge Pistacia integerrima into this species as the subspecies P. chinensis ssp. integerrima, with the plants considered here then becoming the subspecies P. chinensis ssp. chinensis.

== Distribution and habitat ==
Its native range is on hill and mountain forests on rocky soils at 100–3,600 m (330–11,810 ft) above sea level. It is found in Mainland China (excluding the far north and the far west) and Taiwan.

== Invasiveness ==
Chinese Pistache is an up-and-coming invasive species in the United States, especially in Texas. It invades natural areas negatively altering habitats for native animals and reduces biodiversity.

== Ecology ==
Chinese pistache grows best in full sun, being intolerant of shade. It is the most frost tolerant species of Pistacia, tolerating temperatures down to about −25 °C (−13 °F), yet it is most highly regarded in warm climates. It is planted for its impressive fall colors, which develop at least as far south as Orlando, Florida.

== Uses ==
It is a popular choice for street trees in urban settings because it is very drought tolerant and can survive harsh environments. It is also used as an understock for Pistacia vera. In China, the oil from the seeds is used for biodiesel production. The wood is used for production of furniture, and yields a yellow dye.

It is also used in classical Chinese garden design.

== Gallery ==
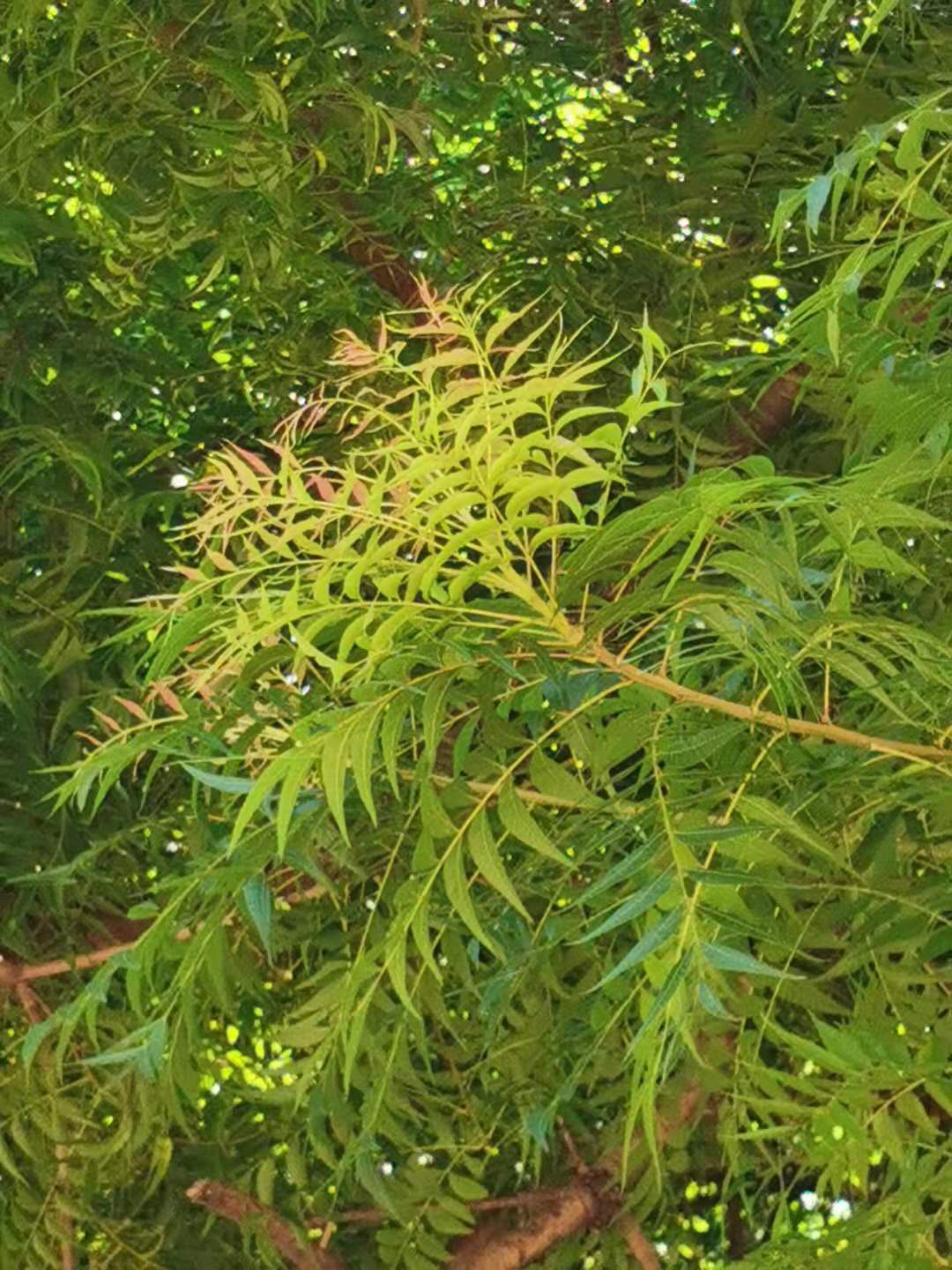
The young leaves are edible and can be used in tea manufacturing.

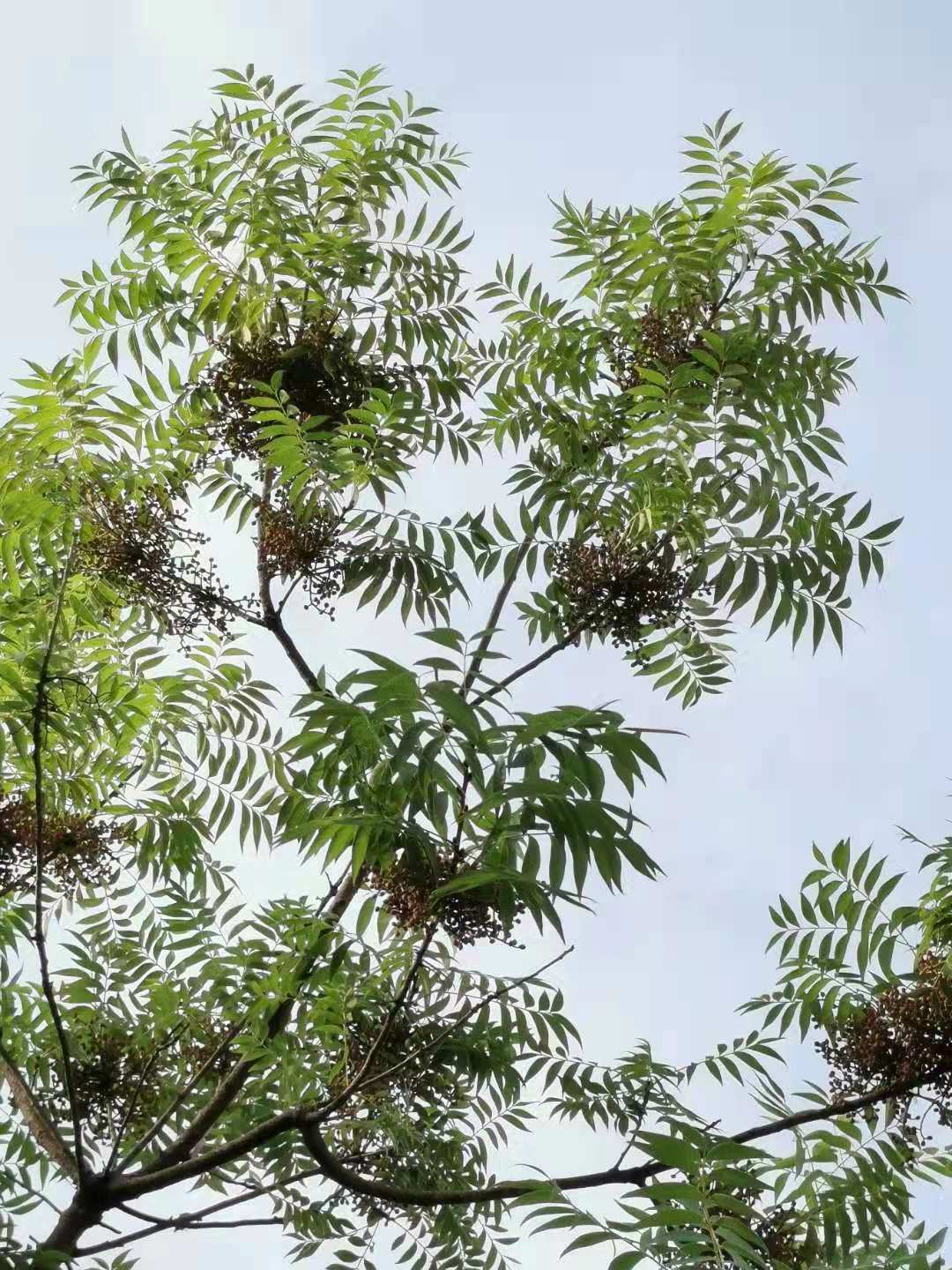
Lobular opposite or nearly opposite

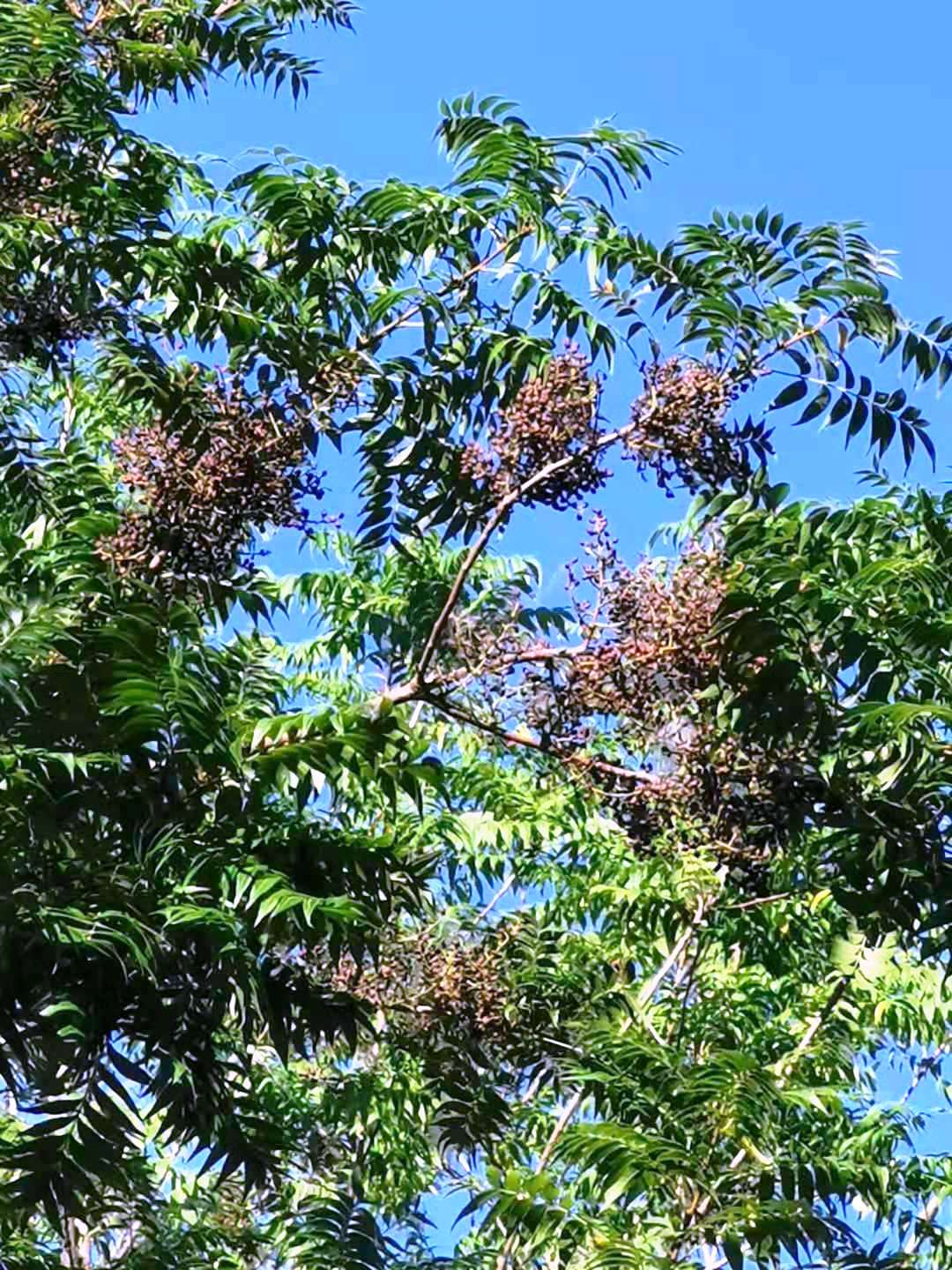
The fruit turns blue when ripe.

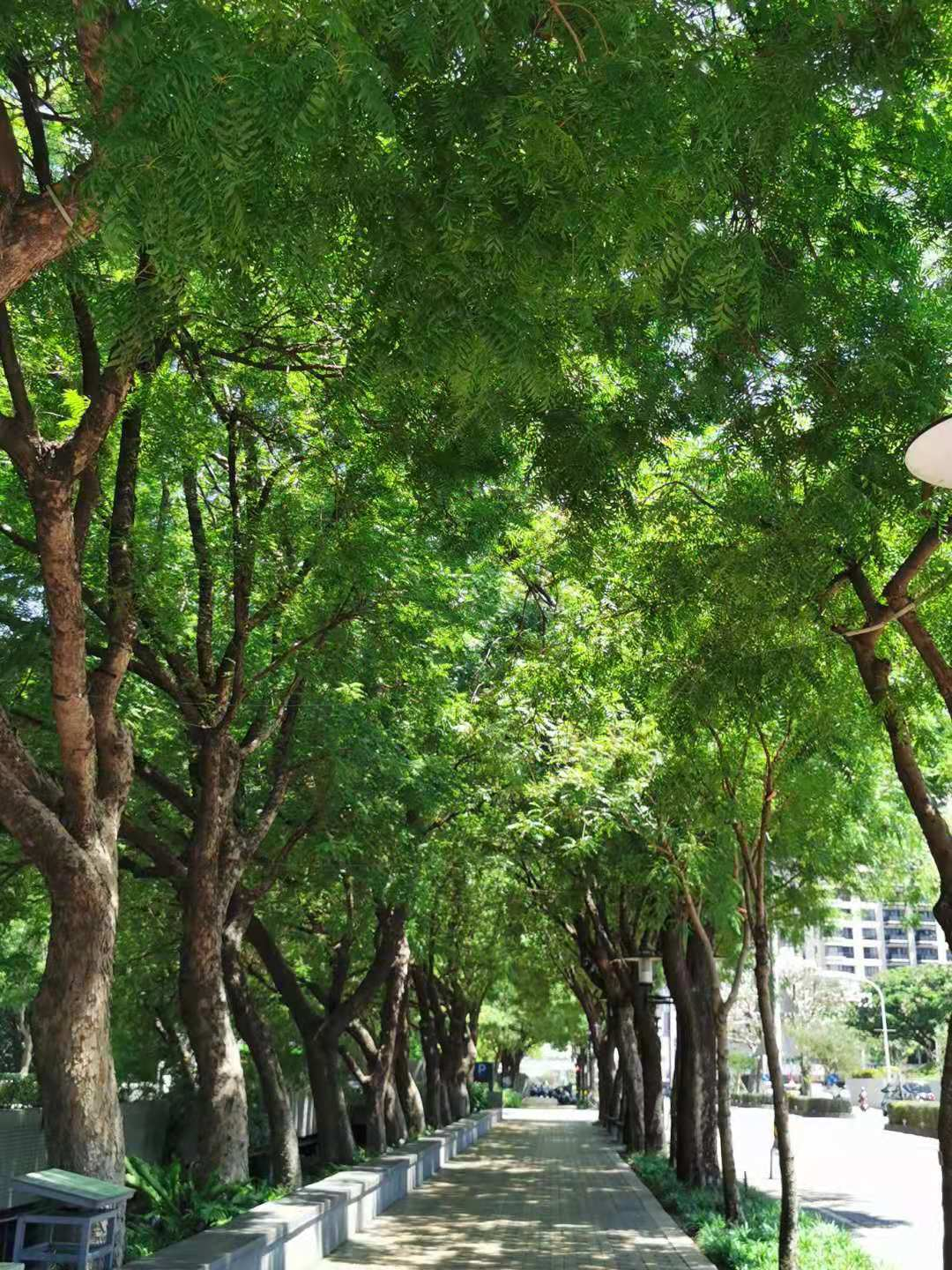
Tree and street trees

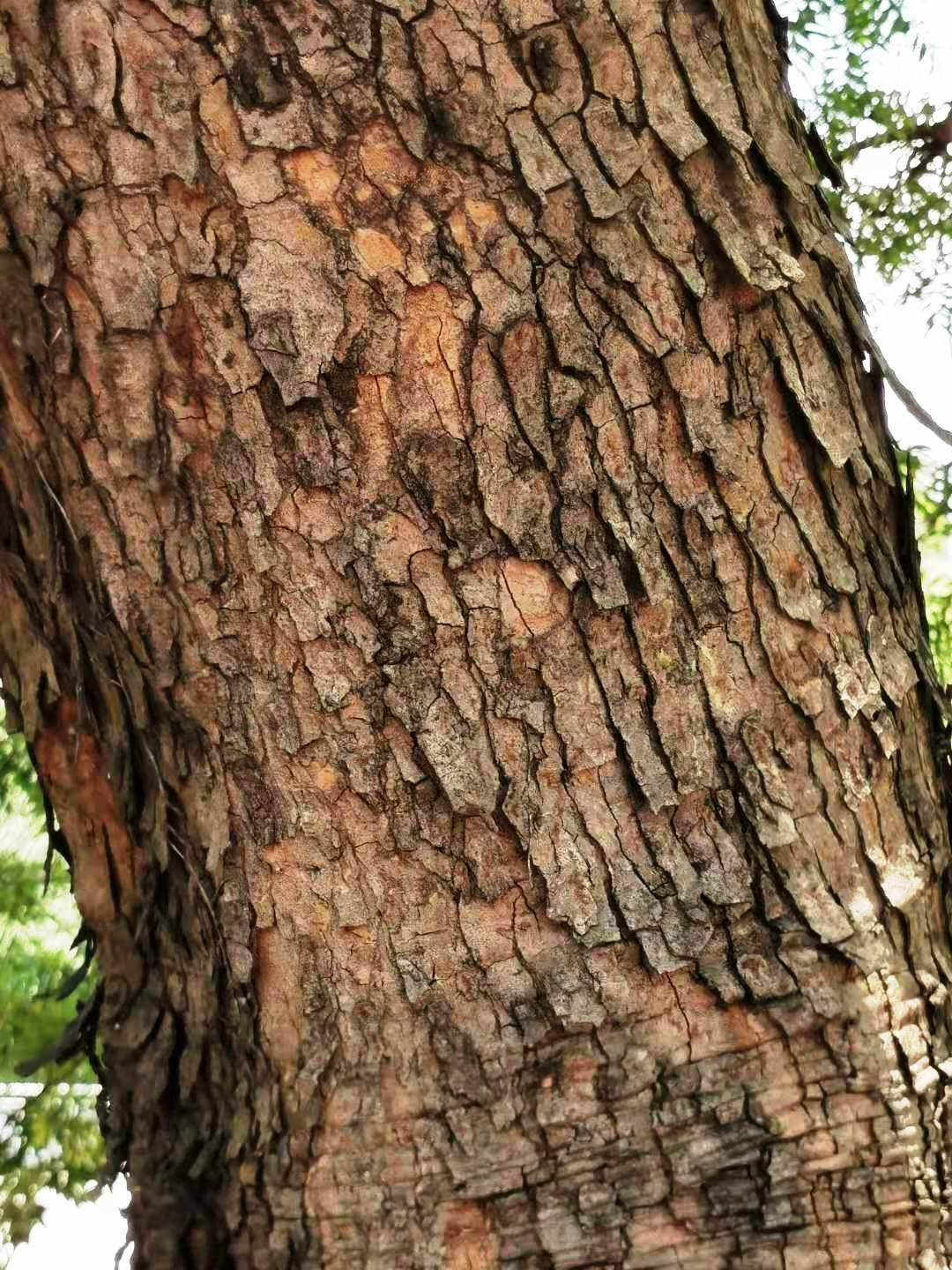
The bark peels off in a scaly shape.

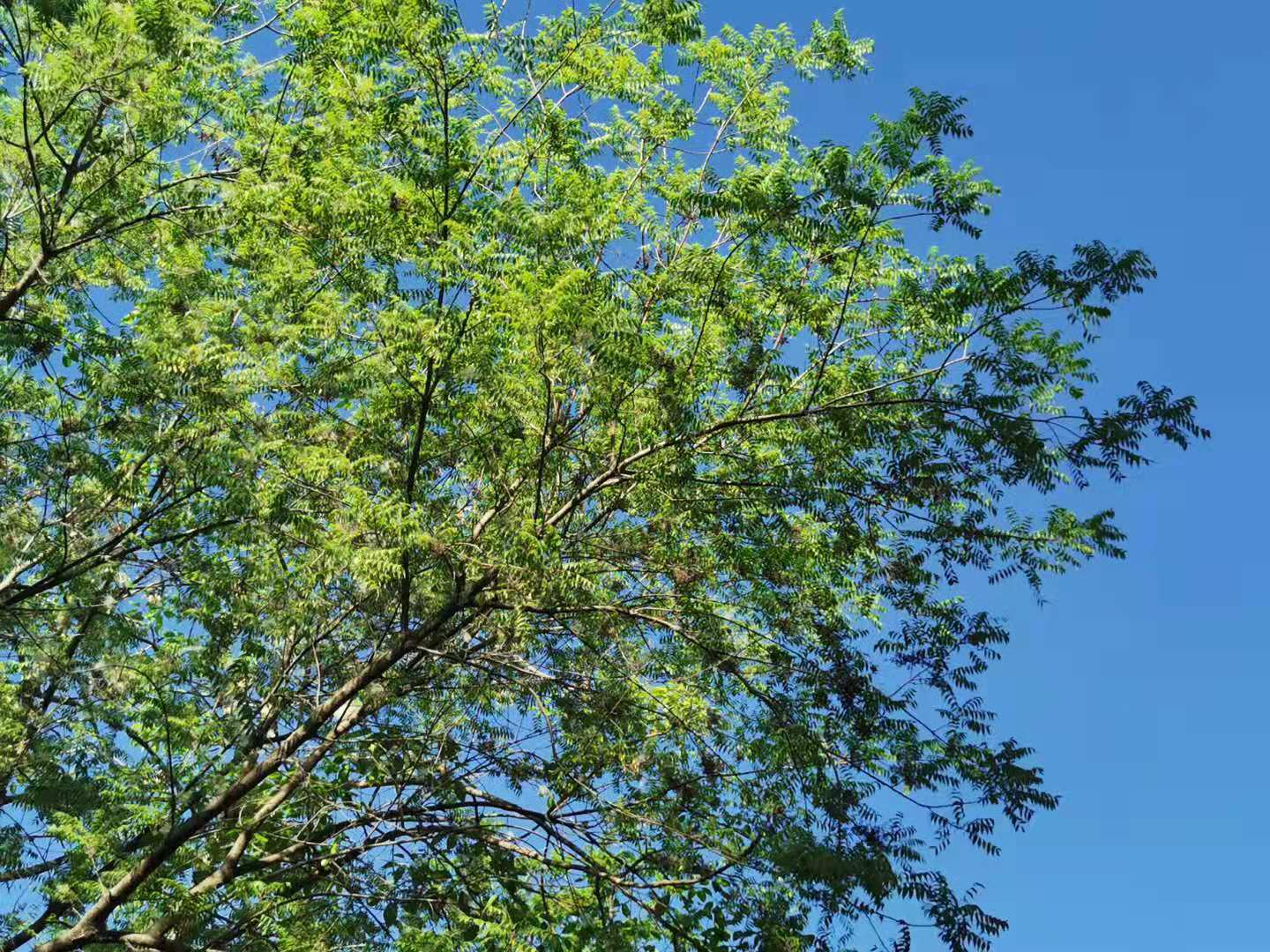
Branches and leaves
