= Pistacia cucphuongensis =

Conservation status
- Data Deficient (IUCN 3.1)

Scientific classification
- Kingdom: Plantae
- Clade: Tracheophytes
- Clade: Angiosperms
- Clade: Eudicots
- Clade: Rosids
- Order: Sapindales
- Family: Anacardiaceae
- Genus: Pistacia
- Species: P. cucphuongensis

Binomial name
- Pistacia cucphuongensis Dai

Species of flowering plant

Pistacia cucphuongensis is a species of plant in the family Anacardiaceae. It is endemic to Vietnam.
