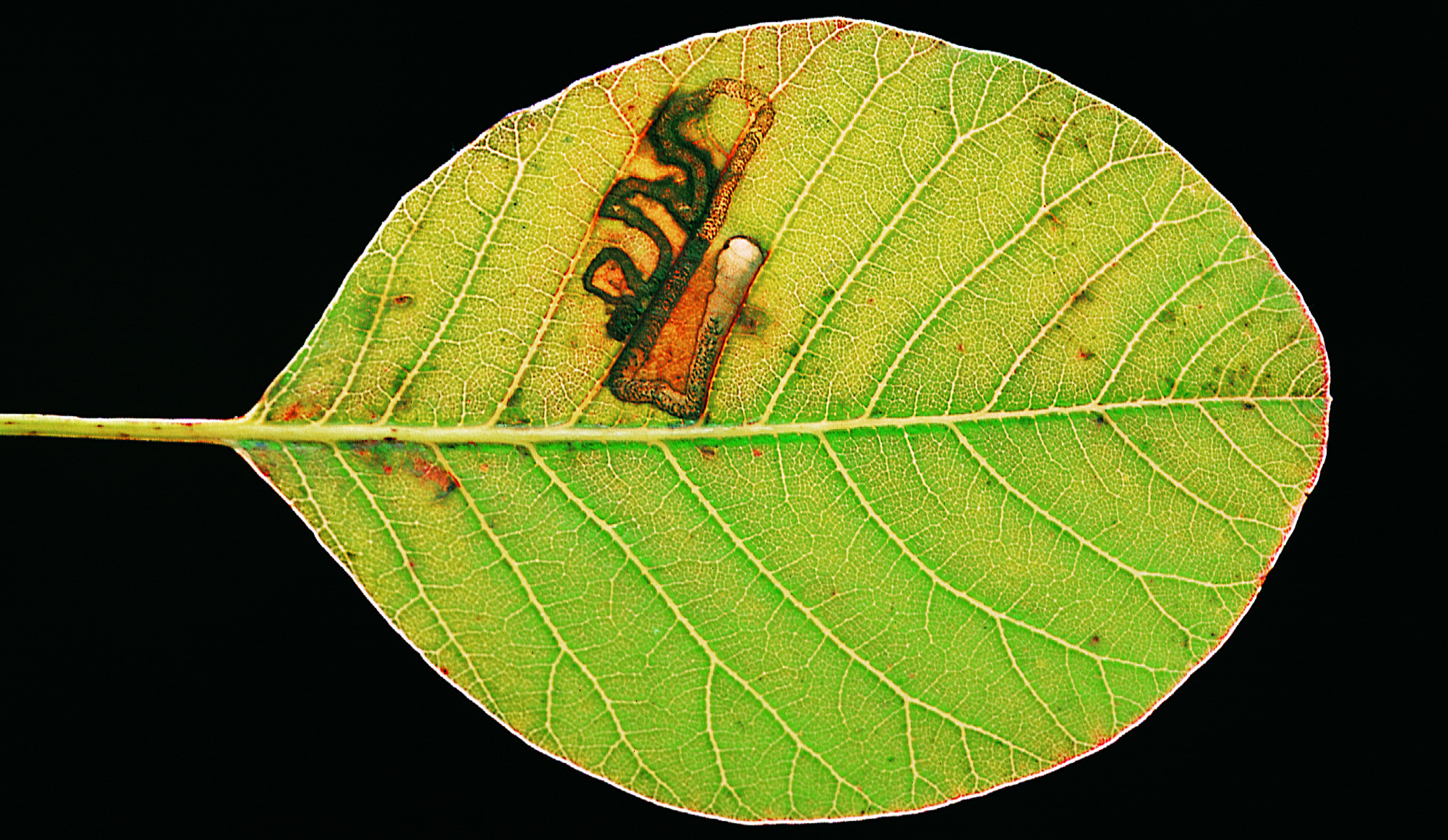
- Simplimorpha promissa

Scientific classification
- Kingdom: Animalia
- Phylum: Arthropoda
- Clade: Pancrustacea
- Class: Insecta
- Order: Lepidoptera
- Family: Nepticulidae
- Genus: Simplimorpha; Scoble, 1983

= Simplimorpha =

Genus of moths

Simplimorpha is a genus of moths of the family Nepticulidae.

== Species ==
- Simplimorpha lanceifoliella (Vari, 1955)
- Simplimorpha promissa (Staudinger, 1870)
