= Β-Pinene =

β-Pinene

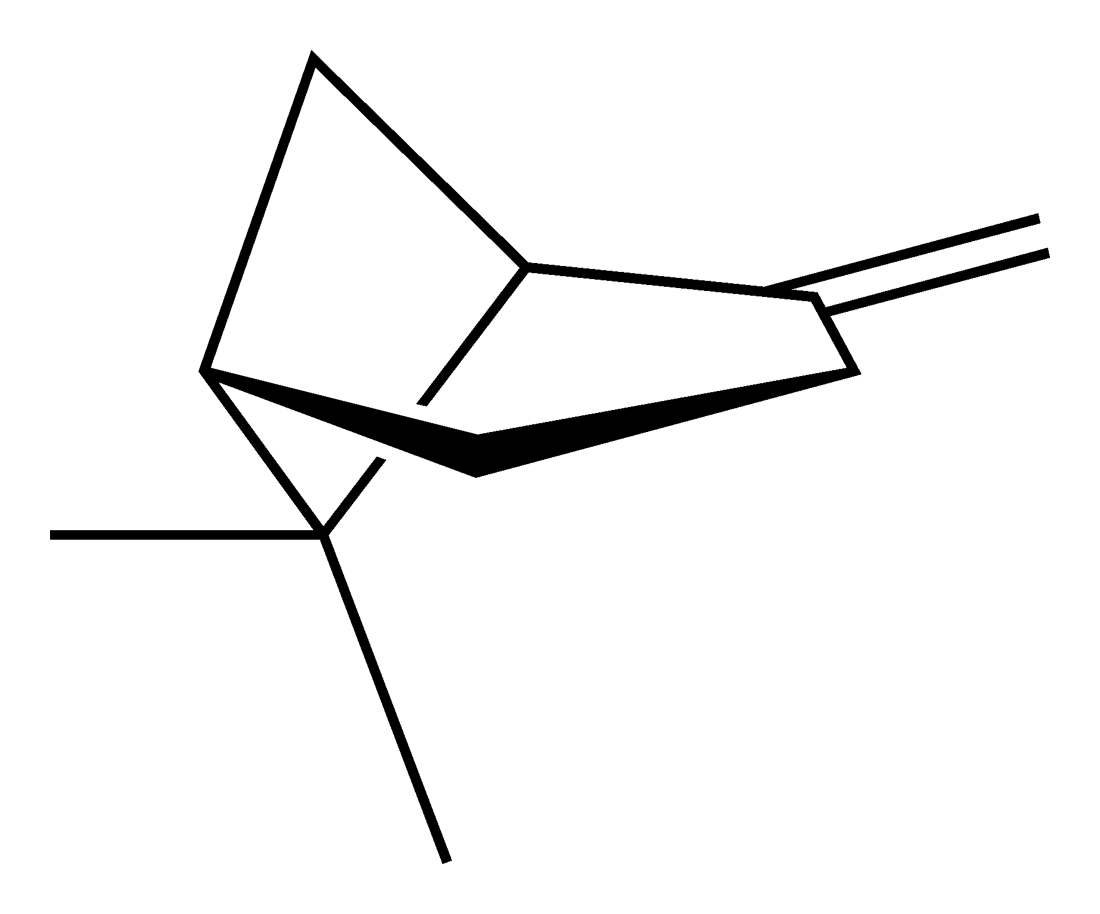

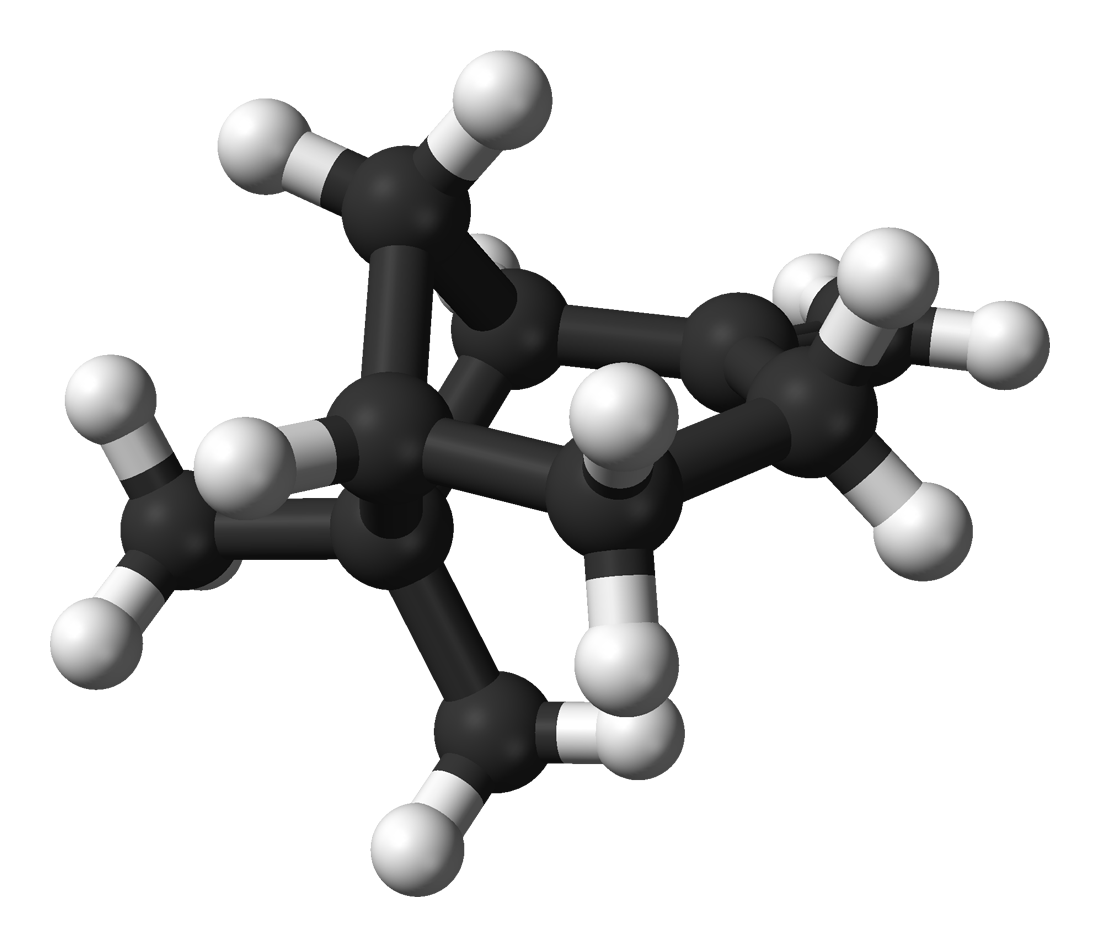

Names
- IUPAC names 6,6-Dimethyl-2-methylidenebicyclo[3.1.1]heptane; Pin-2(10)-ene
- Other names 6,6-Dimethyl-2-methylenebicyclo[3.1.1]heptane; 2(10)-Pinene; Nopinene; Pseudopinene

Identifiers
CAS Number	127-91-3
3D model (JSmol)	Interactive image
ChEBI	CHEBI:50025
ChEMBL	ChEMBL501351
ChemSpider	14198
DrugBank	DB15574
ECHA InfoCard	100.004.430
EC Number	204-872-5
KEGG	C09882
PubChem CID	14896
UNII	4MS8VHZ1HJ
CompTox Dashboard (EPA)	DTXSID7027049
- InChI: InChI=1S/C10H16/c1-7-4-5-8-6-9(7)10(8,2)3/h8-9H,1,4-6H2,2-3H3 Key: WTARULDDTDQWMU-UHFFFAOYSA-N; InChI=1/C10H16/c1-7-4-5-8-6-9(7)10(8,2)3/h8-9H,1,4-6H2,2-3H3 Key: WTARULDDTDQWMU-UHFFFAOYAW
- SMILES: C1(=C)C2CC(CC1)C2(C)C

Properties
Chemical formula	C_{10}H_{16}
Molar mass	136.238 g·mol^{−1}
Appearance	Colorless liquid
Density	0.872 g/mL
Melting point	−61.54 °C; −78.77 °F; 211.61 K
Boiling point	165–167 °C; 329–332 °F; 438–440 K

Thermochemistry
Std enthalpy of combustion (Δ_{c}H^{⦵}_{298})	−6214.1±2.9 kJ/mol

Hazards
- GHS labelling
Pictograms	(GHS02: Flammable) (GHS07: Exclamation mark) (GHS08: Health hazard) (GHS09: Environmental hazard)
Signal word	Danger
Hazard statements	H226, H304, H315, H317, H410
Precautionary statements	P210, P233, P240, P241, P242, P243, P261, P264, P272, P273, P280, P301+P310, P302+P352, P303+P361+P353, P321, P331, P332+P313, P333+P313, P362, P363, P370+P378, P391, P403+P235, P405, P501
NFPA 704 (fire diamond)	1 3 0
Flash point	36 °C (97 °F; 309 K)
- Except where otherwise noted, data are given for materials in their standard state (at 25 °C [77 °F], 100 kPa). verify (what is ?) Infobox references

β-Pinene is a monoterpene, an organic compound found in plants. It is the less abundant of the two isomers of pinene, the other being α-pinene. It is a colorless liquid soluble in alcohol, but not water. It has a woody-green pine-like smell.

β-Pinene is one of the most abundant compounds released by forest trees. If oxidized in air, the allylic products of the pinocarveol and myrtenol family prevail.

== Sources ==
Many plants from many botanical families contain the compound, including:

- Cuminum cyminum
- Humulus lupulus
- Pinus pinaster
- Clausena anisata
- Cannabis sativa
- Piper nigrum
- Myristica fragrans
- Citrus aurantiifolia
- Pistacia lentiscus
- Many Seseli species

The clear compound is produced by distillation of turpentine oils.

== Uses ==
β-Pinene is used in the production of other aroma compounds. It converts to myrcene upon heating at 500 °C. Nerol is obtained by careful fractional distillation of crude nerol from myrcene).

Reaction with formaldehyde (Prins reaction) converts β-pinene to nopol. When nopol is acetylated, the result is nopyl acetate, which is used as fragrance material.
