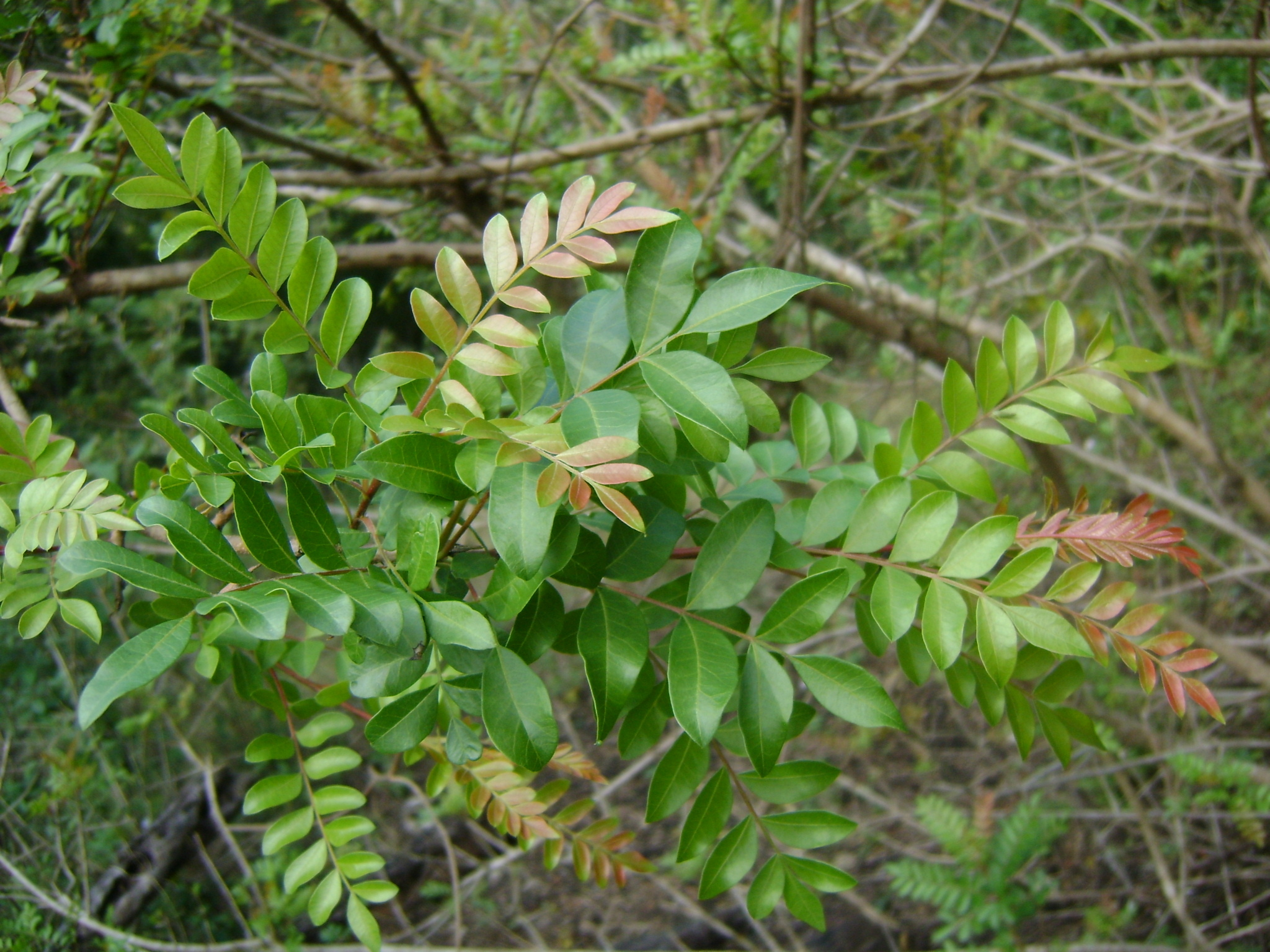
- In Veracruz, Mexico

Conservation status
- Near Threatened (IUCN 3.1)

Scientific classification
- Kingdom: Plantae
- Clade: Tracheophytes
- Clade: Angiosperms
- Clade: Eudicots
- Clade: Rosids
- Order: Sapindales
- Family: Anacardiaceae
- Genus: Pistacia
- Species: P. mexicana

Binomial name
- Pistacia mexicana H.B.K.
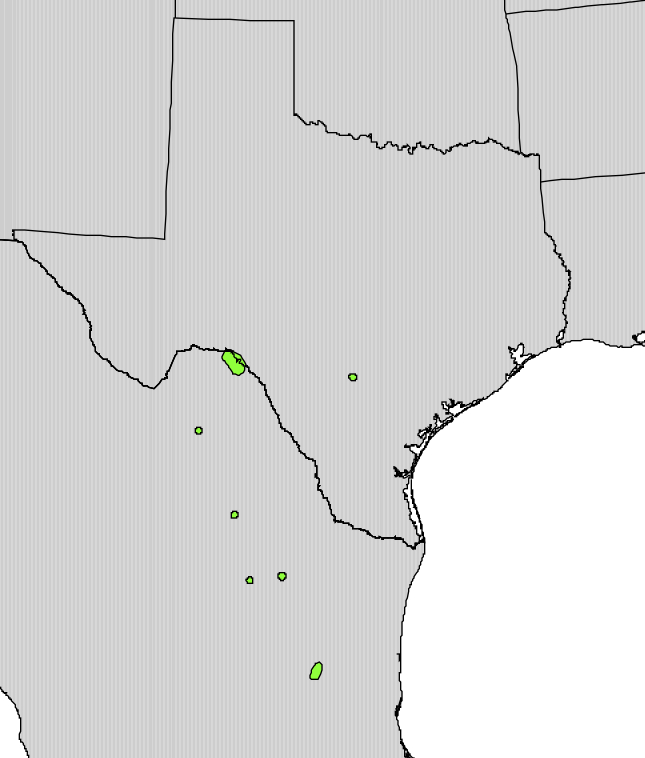
- Native range of Pistacia mexicana

Synonyms
- Pistacia texana

= Pistacia mexicana =

Species of flowering plant

Pistacia mexicana, also known as Mexican pistache, American pistachio or wild pistachio is a species of plant in the family Anacardiaceae found in Guatemala, Mexico, and the United States (Texas). It is threatened by habitat loss.

Although goats browse the plant's leaves, the species is largely unimportant as a food source as the small seeds are often empty.
