= Α-Pinene =

α-Pinene

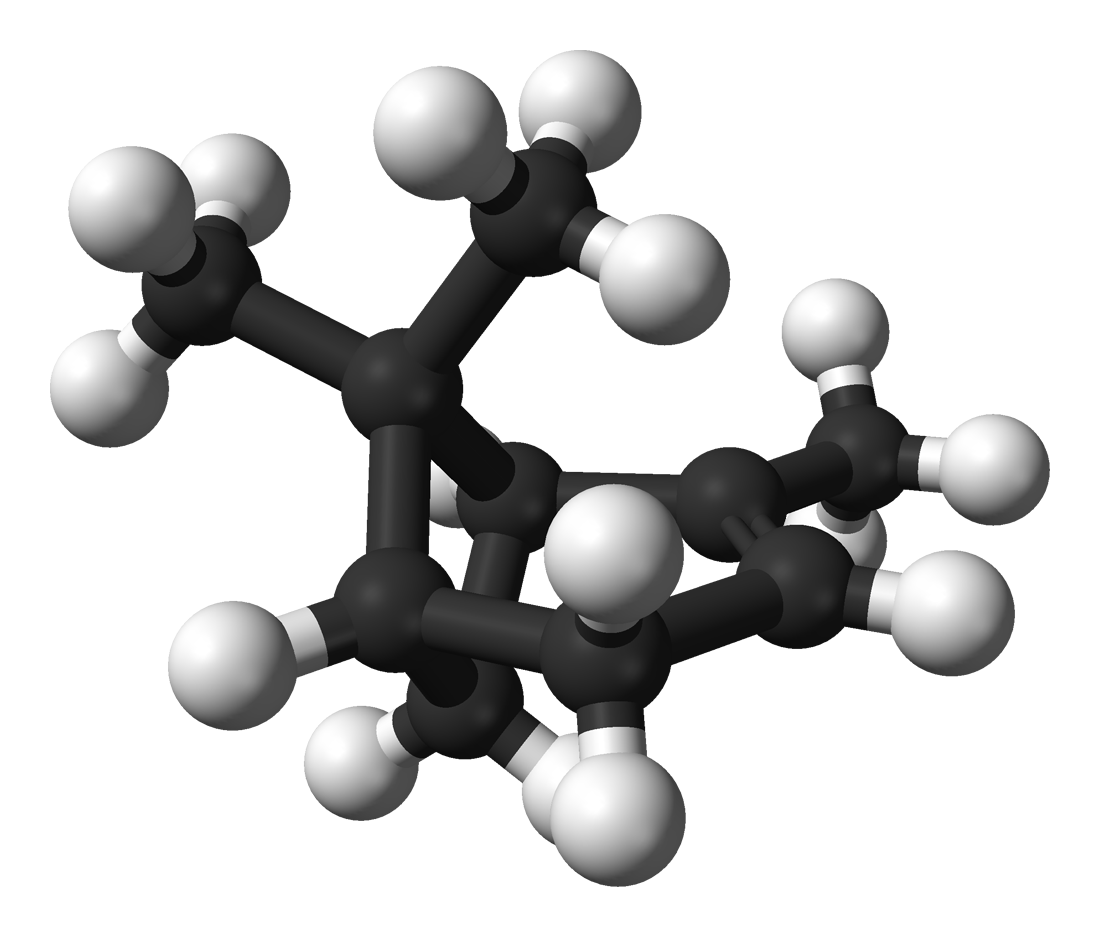
(+)-α-pinene
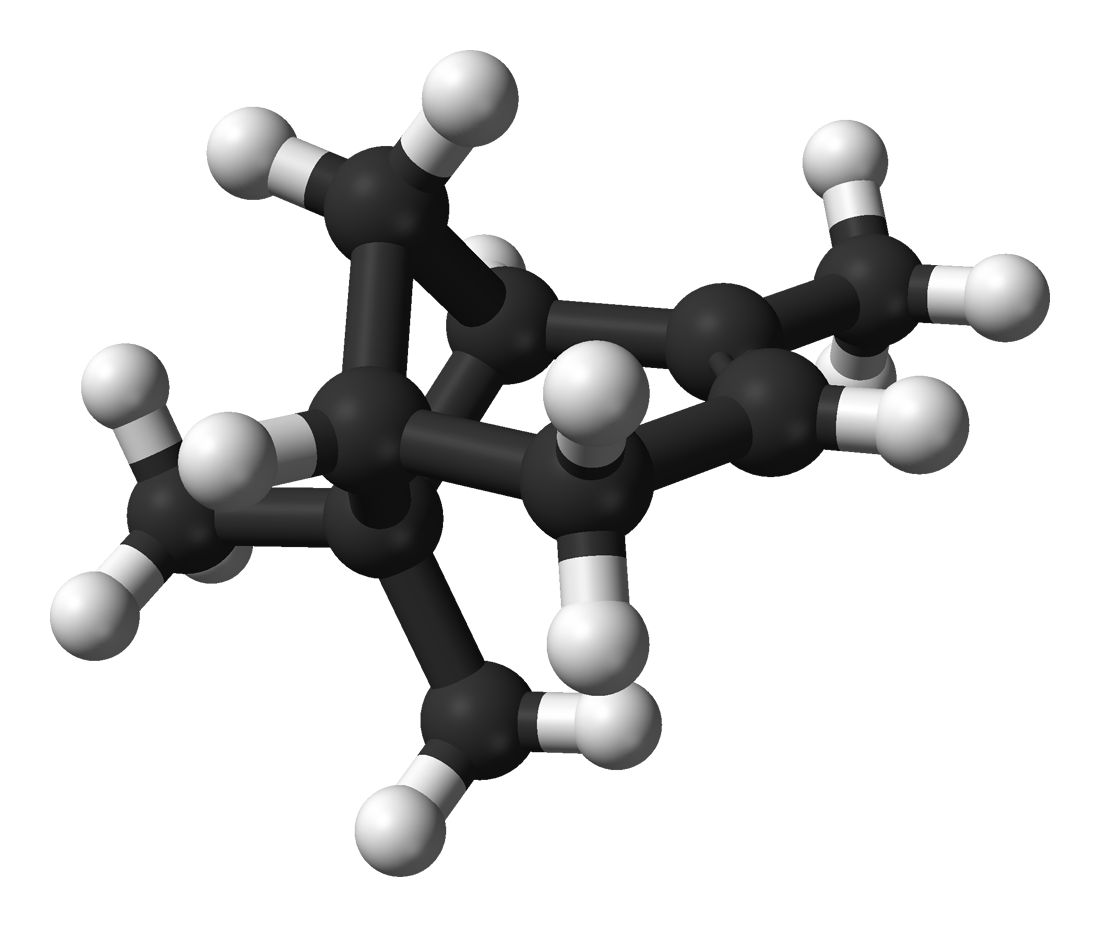
(−)-α-pinene

Names
- IUPAC name (1S,5S)-2,6,6-Trimethylbicyclo[3.1.1]hept-2-ene ((−)-α-Pinene)

Identifiers
CAS Number	80-56-8 unspecified; (+): 7785-70-8; (−): 7785-26-4
3D model (JSmol)	Interactive image
ChEBI	CHEBI:36740 unspecified; (+): CHEBI:28261; (−): CHEBI:28660
ChemSpider	389795
ECHA InfoCard	100.029.161
EC Number	(−): 232-077-3
KEGG	C06308
PubChem CID	440968
RTECS number	DT7000000 (unspec. isomer)
UNII	JPF3YI7O34 unspecified; (+): H6CM4TWH1W; (−): TZR3GM95PR
UN number	2368
CompTox Dashboard (EPA)	DTXSID2029290
- InChI: InChI=1S/C10H16/c1-7-4-5-8-6-9(7)10(8,2)3/h4,8-9H,5-6H2,1-3H3/t8-,9-/m0/s1 Key: GRWFGVWFFZKLTI-IUCAKERBSA-N; InChI=1/C10H16/c1-7-4-5-8-6-9(7)10(8,2)3/h4,8-9H,5-6H2,1-3H3/t8-,9-/m0/s1 Key: GRWFGVWFFZKLTI-IUCAKERBBG
- SMILES: C\1=C(\[C@@H]2C[C@H](C/1)C2(C)C)C

Properties
Chemical formula	C_{10}H_{16}
Molar mass	136.238 g·mol^{−1}
Appearance	Clear colorless liquid
Density	0.858 g/mL (liquid at 20 °C)
Melting point	−62.80 °C; −81.04 °F; 210.35 K
Boiling point	155 °C (311 °F; 428 K)
Solubility in water	Very low
Solubility	Insoluble in chloroform, diethyl ether
Solubility in acetic acid	Miscible
Solubility in ethanol	Miscible
Solubility in acetone	Miscible
Vapor pressure	0.5 kPa
Chiral rotation ([α]_{D})	−50.7° (1S,5S-Pinene)

Hazards
- Occupational safety and health (OHS/OSH)
Main hazards	Flammable
- GHS labelling
Pictograms	(GHS02: Flammable) (GHS07: Exclamation mark) (GHS08: Health hazard) (GHS09: Environmental hazard)
Signal word	Danger
Hazard statements	H226, H302, H304, H315, H317, H410
Precautionary statements	P210, P233, P240, P241, P242, P243, P261, P264, P270, P272, P273, P280, P301+P310, P301+P312, P302+P352, P303+P361+P353, P321, P330, P331, P332+P313, P333+P313, P362, P363, P370+P378, P391, P403+P235, P405, P501
NFPA 704 (fire diamond)	3 3 0
Flash point	33 °C (91 °F; 306 K)
Autoignition temperature	255 °C (491 °F; 528 K)
Explosive limits	0.8% v/v (lower); 6% v/v (upper)
- Lethal dose or concentration (LD, LC)
LD_{50} (median dose)	300-2000 mg/kg (rat, oral) > 5 g/kg (rabbit, dermal)
LC_{50} (median concentration)	625 ppm/min (rat)
Safety data sheet (SDS)	Fisher Scientific

Related compounds
Related alkene	β-pinene, camphene, 3-carene, limonene
Related compounds	borneol, camphor, terpineol
- Except where otherwise noted, data are given for materials in their standard state (at 25 °C [77 °F], 100 kPa). verify (what is ?) Infobox references

α-Pinene is an organic compound of the terpene class. It is one of the two isomers of pinene, the other being β-pinene. An alkene, it contains a strained four-membered ring. It is found in the oils of many species of coniferous trees, notably Pinus and Picea species. It is also found in the essential oil of rosemary (Rosmarinus officinalis), Satureja myrtifolia (also known as Zoufa in some regions), and many species of Seseli. Both enantiomers are known in nature; (1S,5S)- or (−)-α-pinene is more common in European pines, whereas the (1R,5R)- or (+)-α-isomer is more common in North America. The enantiomers' racemic mixture is present in some oils such as eucalyptus oil and orange peel oil.

== Reactivity ==
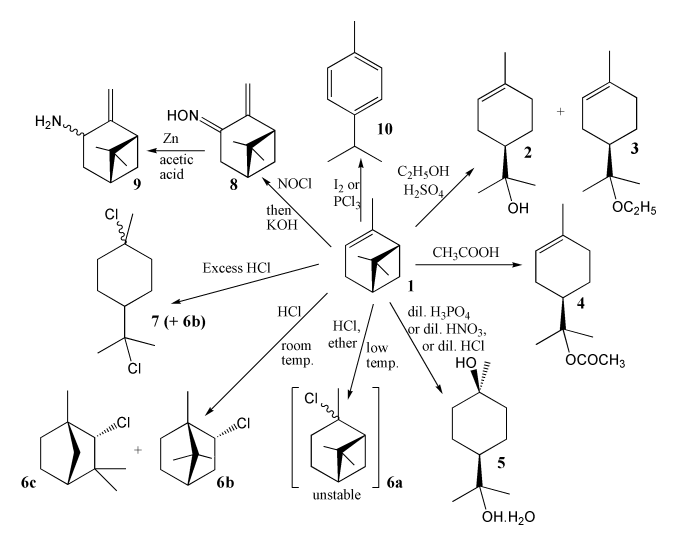

Commercially important derivatives of α-pinene are linalool, geraniol, nerol, α-terpineol, and camphene.

α-Pinene 1 demonstrates reactivity arising from the presence of the four-membered ring adjacent to the alkene. The compound is prone to skeletal rearrangements such as the Wagner–Meerwein rearrangement. Acids typically lead to rearranged products. With concentrated sulfuric acid and ethanol the major products are terpineol 2 and its ethyl ether 3, while glacial acetic acid gives the corresponding acetate 4. With dilute acids, terpin hydrate 5 becomes the major product.

With one molar equivalent of anhydrous HCl, the simple addition product 6a can be formed at low temperature in the presence of diethyl ether, but it is very unstable. At normal temperatures, or if no ether is present, the major product is bornyl chloride 6b, along with a small amount of fenchyl chloride 6c. For many years 6b (also called "artificial camphor") was referred to as "pinene hydrochloride", until it was confirmed as identical with bornyl chloride made from camphene. If more HCl is used, achiral 7 (dipentene hydrochloride) is the major product along with some 6b. Nitrosyl chloride followed by base leads to the oxime 8 which can be reduced to "pinylamine" 9. Both 8 and 9 are stable compounds containing an intact four-membered ring, and these compounds helped greatly in identifying this important component of the pinene skeleton.

Under aerobic oxidation conditions, the main oxidation products are pinene oxide, verbenyl hydroperoxide, verbenol and verbenone.

== Atmospheric role ==
Monoterpenes, of which α-pinene is one of the principal species, are emitted in substantial amounts by vegetation, and these emissions are affected by temperature and light intensity. In the atmosphere α-pinene undergoes reactions with ozone, the hydroxyl radical or the NO_{3} radical, leading to low-volatility species which partly condense on existing aerosols, thereby generating secondary organic aerosols. This has been shown in numerous laboratory experiments for the mono- and sesquiterpenes. Products of α-pinene which have been identified explicitly are pinonaldehyde, norpinonaldehyde, pinic acid, pinonic acid and pinalic acid.

== Properties and usage ==
α-Pinene is highly bioavailable, with 60% human pulmonary uptake and rapid metabolism or redistribution. α-Pinene is an anti-inflammatory via PGE1, and is likely antimicrobial. It exhibits activity as an acetylcholinesterase inhibitor, aiding memory. Like borneol, verbenol and pinocarveol (−)-α-pinene is a positive modulator of GABAA receptors. It acts at the benzodiazepine binding site.

α-Pinene forms the biosynthetic base for CB2 ligands, such as HU-308.

α-Pinene is one of the many terpenes and terpenoids found in cannabis plants. These compounds are also present in significant levels in the finished, dried cannabis flower preparation commonly known as marijuana. It is widely theorized by scientists and cannabis experts alike that these terpenes and terpenoids contribute significantly to the unique "character" or "personality" of each marijuana strain's unique effects. α-Pinene in particular is thought to reduce the memory deficits commonly reported as a side-effect of THC consumption. It likely demonstrates this activity due to its action as an acetylcholinesterase inhibitor, a class of compounds which are known to aid memory and increase alertness.

α-Pinene also contributes significantly to many of the odor profiles of marijuana strains, varieties, and cultivars.
