= Pistacia aethiopica =

Conservation status
- Near Threatened (IUCN 2.3)

Scientific classification
- Kingdom: Plantae
- Clade: Tracheophytes
- Clade: Angiosperms
- Clade: Eudicots
- Clade: Rosids
- Order: Sapindales
- Family: Anacardiaceae
- Genus: Pistacia
- Species: P. aethiopica

Binomial name
- Pistacia aethiopica Kokwaro

Species of shrub

Pistacia aethiopica is an African and Arabia coast peninsula species of plant in the family Anacardiaceae. It is a dioecious evergreen shrub or tree of the pistacia genus, growing up to 20 m (66 ft) tall, adapted to the dry environment. It is found in Ethiopia, Kenya, Somalia, Somaliland, Tanzania, Uganda, and Yemen.

== Description ==
It is an evergreen slow-growing tree that emits a very intense smell: bitter, resinous or similar to medication. The tree reaches 5–15 m tall, and rarely is a shrub, often with multiple stems, the trunk of 0.6 m in diameter, and its bark color is brown-black and fissured. It has glabrous leathery leaves, with a thick cuticle. The leaves are aromatic, 4-16-18 foliolate, and glossy bright green. The leaves have rachis 10 cm long. The tree is dioecious, with male and female trees producing different sex flowers. Both types of flowers are small and greenish. It grows slowly, becoming 1000 years old.

== Ecology ==
It is found in dry evergreen forest (often with Juniperus and Olea - Euclea) and associated shrubs or wooded grassland, thickets of Buxus, deciduous with Combretum, Acacia and Barkey in soils of limestone, sandstone, or basalt, to an altitude of 900–2550 m. P. aethiopica have many adaptations to aridity, such as an advanced development of palisade tissue and extensive root growth. These adaptive traits allow species to grow in very harsh and dry areas with low rainfall. In the main part of its range in North and East Africa, the species is fairly common because is used for a variety of purposes, including timber, dye, fodder, agriculture and livestock food. An outlying subpopulation in Arabia is restricted to Jebel Iraf on the old North Yemen-South Yemen border. The species is thought to be extinct in Eritrea.
