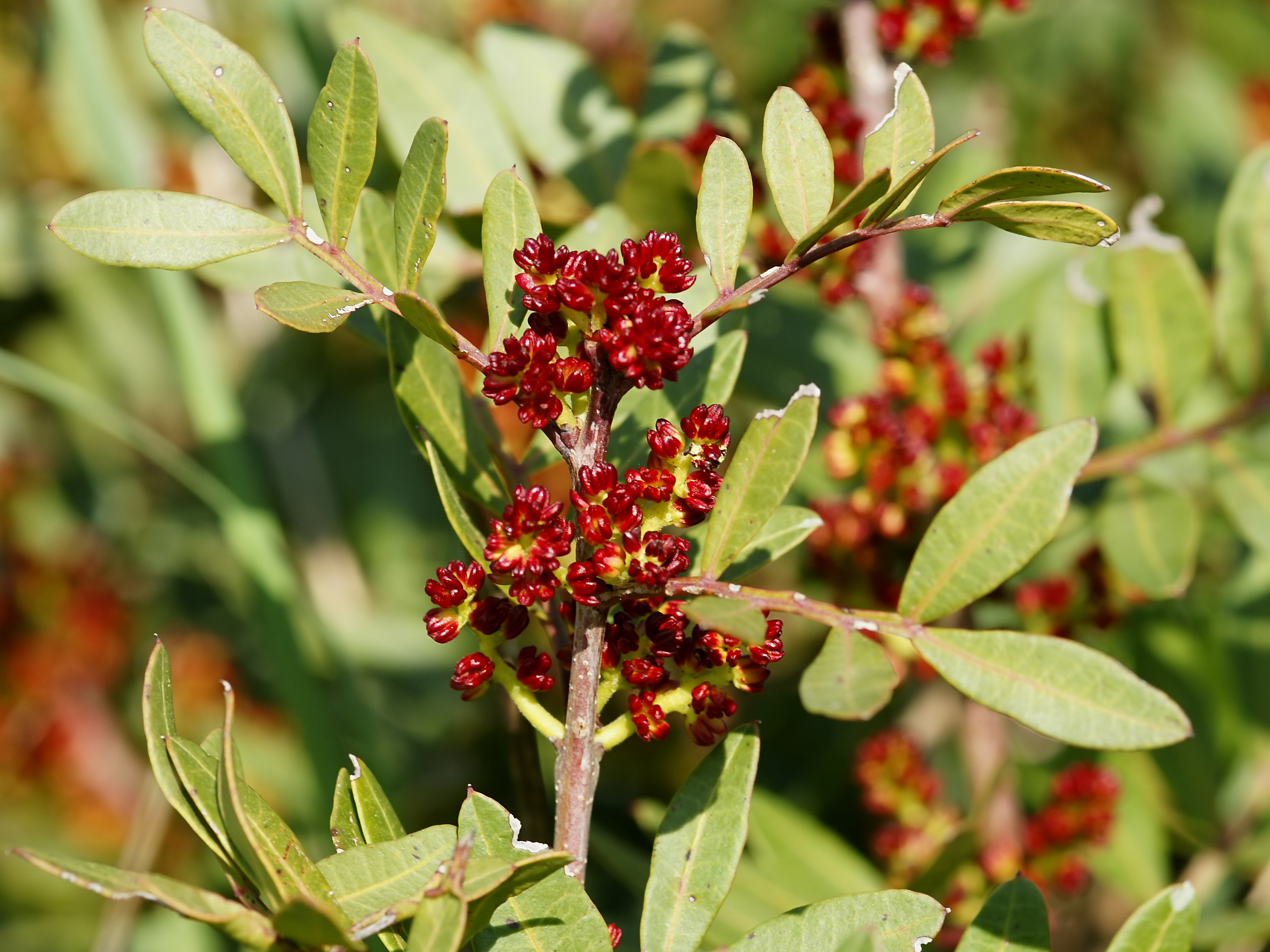
- Pistacia lentiscus

Scientific classification
- Kingdom: Plantae
- Clade: Tracheophytes
- Clade: Angiosperms
- Clade: Eudicots
- Clade: Rosids
- Order: Sapindales
- Family: Anacardiaceae
- Subfamily: Anacardioideae
- Genus: Pistacia; L.

Species
- See text

Synonyms
- Terebinthus Mill.

= Pistacia =

Genus of flowering plants in the sumac family

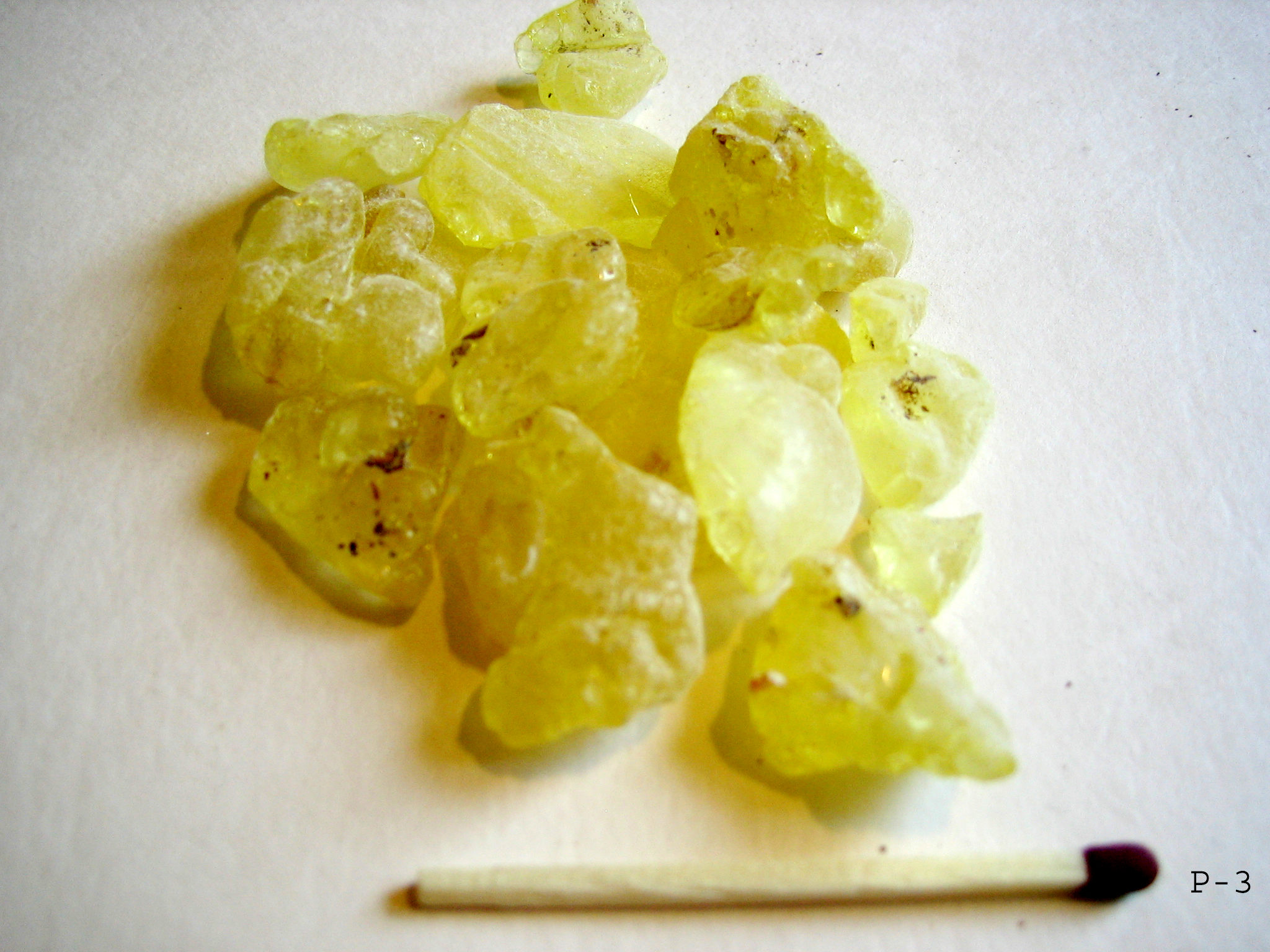
Mastic resin from Pistacia lentiscus

Pistacia is a genus of flowering plants in the cashew family, Anacardiaceae. It contains 10 to 20 species that are native to Africa and Eurasia from the Canary Islands, all of Africa, and southern Europe, warm and semidesert areas across Asia, and North America from Guatemala to Mexico, as well as southern Texas.

== Description ==
Pistacia plants are shrubs and small trees growing to 5–15 m (16–49 ft) tall. The leaves are alternate, pinnately compound, and can be either evergreen or deciduous depending on species. All species are dioecious, but monoecious individuals of Pistacia atlantica have been noted. The genus is estimated to be about 80 million years old.

It is a genus of flowering plants belonging to the family Anacardiaceae. The plants are dioecious, and have male and female trees independently; a viable population should have both sexes.

Well-known species in the genus Pistacia include P. vera, the pistachio, grown for its edible seeds; P. terebinthus, from which terebinth resin, a turpentine, is produced; P. lentiscus, source of the plant resin mastic; and P. chinensis, the Chinese pistache, cultivated as an ornamental tree.

=== P. vera genome ===
Scientists from Iran and China assembled a draft genome of pistachio and resequenced 107 whole genomes, including 93 domestic and 14 wild individuals of P. vera and 35 other genomes from different wild Pistacia species. Integrating genomic and transcriptomic analyses revealed expanded gene families (e.g., cytochrome P450 and chitinase) and the jasmonic acid (JA) biosynthetic pathway that are likely involved in stress adaptation. Comparative population genomic analyses revealed that pistachio was domesticated about 8000 years ago, and that likely key genes for domestication are those involved in tree and seed size, which experienced artificial selection.

== Species ==
Image	Scientific name	Common name	Distribution
	Pistacia aethiopica Kokwaro		Ethiopia, Kenya, Somalia, Tanzania, Uganda, and Yemen
	Pistacia atlantica Desf.	betoum	Eurasia from the Iranian Plateau to North Africa
	Pistacia chinensis Bunge	Chinese pistache	central and western China
	Pistacia cucphuongensis Dai		Vietnam
	Pistacia eurycarpa Yalt.		Zagros Mountains, Iraq
	Pistacia falcata Beccari ex Martelli		northeast tropical Africa, Arabian Peninsula
	Pistacia khinjuk Stocks		Egypt, western Asia, and parts of the Himalayas
	Pistacia integerrima J.L.Stewart ex Brandis		Asia
	Pistacia lentiscus L.	mastic	Mediterranean Basin
	Pistacia malayana M.R.Henderson.		Peninsular Malaysia
	Pistacia mexicana Kunth	Mexican pistache (including P. texana Swingle – Texas pistache), American pistachio	Guatemala, Mexico, and Texas
	Pistacia ×saportae Burnat		Europe
	Pistacia terebinthus L.	terebinth and turpentine tree	Morocco, and Portugal to Greece, western and southeast Turkey, Cyprus and Levant region (especially Israel and Syria)
	Pistacia vera L.	pistachio	Central Asia and the Middle East
	Pistacia weinmannifolia J.Poiss. ex Franch.		Yunnan province of China

Bursera simaruba (L.) Sarg. was formerly classified as P. simaruba L.

== Ecology ==
The Pistacia species are vicarious Anacardiaceae with few species outside the Old World, and are mostly more adapted to water shortage and alkaline soil.

Many plant species are adapted to desert or summer drought typical of Mediterranean climate, so have a high tolerance to saline soil. They grow well in water containing up to 0.3–0.4% of soluble salts. They are quite resilient in their ecological requirements, and can survive in temperatures ranging from −10 °C in winter to 45 °C in summer. They prefer places oriented toward the sun and well-drained soil, but grow well in the bottom of ravines. Though very hardy and drought resistant, Pistacia species grow slowly and only begin to bear fruit after about 7–10 years from planting, obtaining full development only after 15–20 years. The fruit ripens in the Mediterranean from August; only female trees have fruit.

Although some species prefer moderate humidity, they do not grow well in high-humidity conditions. They are susceptible to root rot, molds, and fungi, and parasites attack if they receive too much water and the soil has insufficient drainage. They require a period of drought each year for proper development. Their leaves are intensely bright green and leathery, with three to nine leaflets. The leaves are alternate, compound, and paripinnate. The flowers are unisexual, apetalous, and grouped in clusters. The flowers range from purple to green. The fruit is a drupe, generally unpalatable to humans, the size of a pea, and red to brown in color, depending on the degree of maturation. The seeds do not have endosperm. The seeds are eaten and dispersed by birds, for which they are a valuable resource because of the scarcity of food in some important times of year, as the time of breeding, migration, or the dry season. The commercial species of pistachio has larger fruits and is edible.

The plants emit a bitter, resinous, or medicative smell, which in some species is very intense and aromatic. Some species develop "galls" that occur in the leaves and leaflets after the bite of insects. Although marred by the presence of galls, they are very vigorous and resistant plants that survive in degraded areas where other species have been eliminated. They multiply by seeds, stolons, and root shoots. Various species hybridize easily between them, and hybrid plants are difficult to identify.

Some tree species (e.g. Pistacia aethiopica, Pistacia atlantica) can exist as small bushes and shrubs due to the extremes of their habitat, adverse conditions, or the excessive consumption by wildlife or livestock that hinders growth.

Pistacia lentiscus is a very common plant related to P. terebinthus with which it hybridizes. P. terebinthus is more abundant in the mountains and inland in the Iberian Peninsula, and mastic is usually found more frequently in areas where the Mediterranean influence of the sea prevents or moderates frost. Some species with very small ranges cover only one or a group of islands in the Mediterranean. P. terebinthus is also found on the east coast of the Mediterranean, Syria, Lebanon, and Israel, filling the same ecological niche of these species. On the west coast of the Mediterranean, the Canary Islands, and the Middle East, it can be confused with Pistacia atlantica.

Pistacia species are used as food plants by the larvae (caterpillars) of some species of Lepidoptera including the emperor moth.

== Cultivation and uses ==
Best known as the pistachio, P. vera is a small tree native to Iran, grown for its edible seeds. The seeds of the other species were also eaten in prehistory, but are too small to have commercial value today. Records of Pistacia from preclassical archaeological sites, and mentions in preclassical texts, always refer to one of these other species (often P. terebinthus).

P. terebinthus (the terebinth), also a native of Iran, and the western Mediterranean countries, is tapped for turpentine. It is also common in the eastern Mediterranean countries. Because terebinths have the ability to kill certain bacteria, terebinth resin was widely used as a preservative in ancient wine. In the Zagros Mountains of Iran, in one of the earliest examples of winemaking, archaeologists discovered terebinth resin deposits from 5400 to 5000 BC in jars that also contained grape-juice residue.

P. lentiscus, an evergreen shrub or small tree of the Mediterranean region, supplies a resin called mastic.

P. chinensis (Chinese pistache), the most frost-tolerant species in the genus, is grown as an ornamental tree, valued for its bright red autumn leaf colour.
