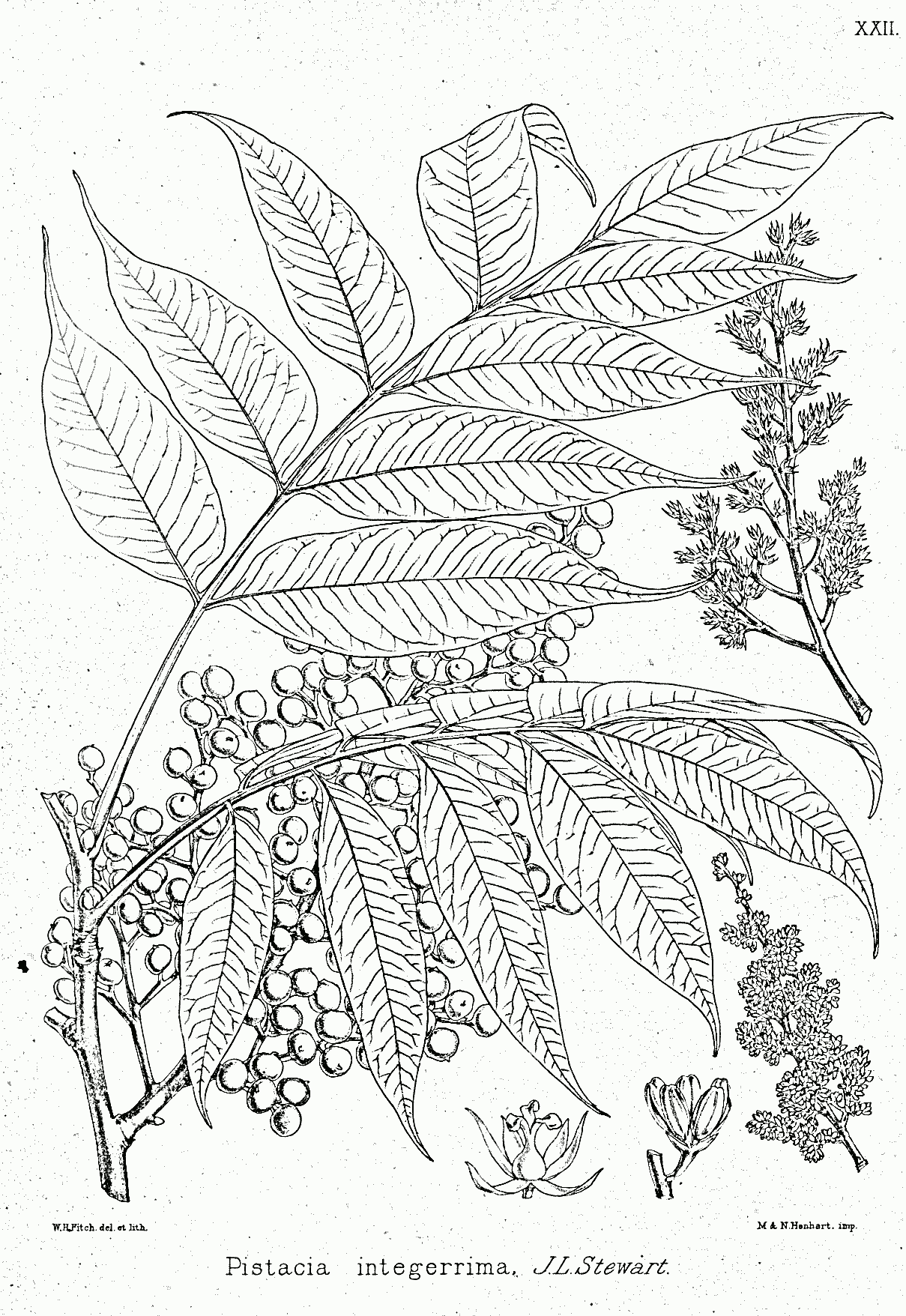

Scientific classification
- Kingdom: Plantae
- Clade: Tracheophytes
- Clade: Angiosperms
- Clade: Eudicots
- Clade: Rosids
- Order: Sapindales
- Family: Anacardiaceae
- Genus: Pistacia
- Species: P. integerrima

Binomial name
- Pistacia integerrima J.L.Stewart ex Brandis

= Pistacia integerrima =

Species of tree

Pistacia integerrima is a species of pistachio tree native to Asia, commonly called zebrawood. It is often classified as Pistacia chinensis ssp. integerrima. It is used for a variety of purposes in India, including timber, dye, and fodder. The leaf galls are used in traditional herbalism for cough, asthma, fever, vomiting, and diarrhea.

Long, horn-shaped leaf galls that often develop on this tree are harvested and used to make kakadshringi, an herbal medicine for diarrhea in northern India.

This tree is also used as a rootstock in the cultivation of commercial pistachios.

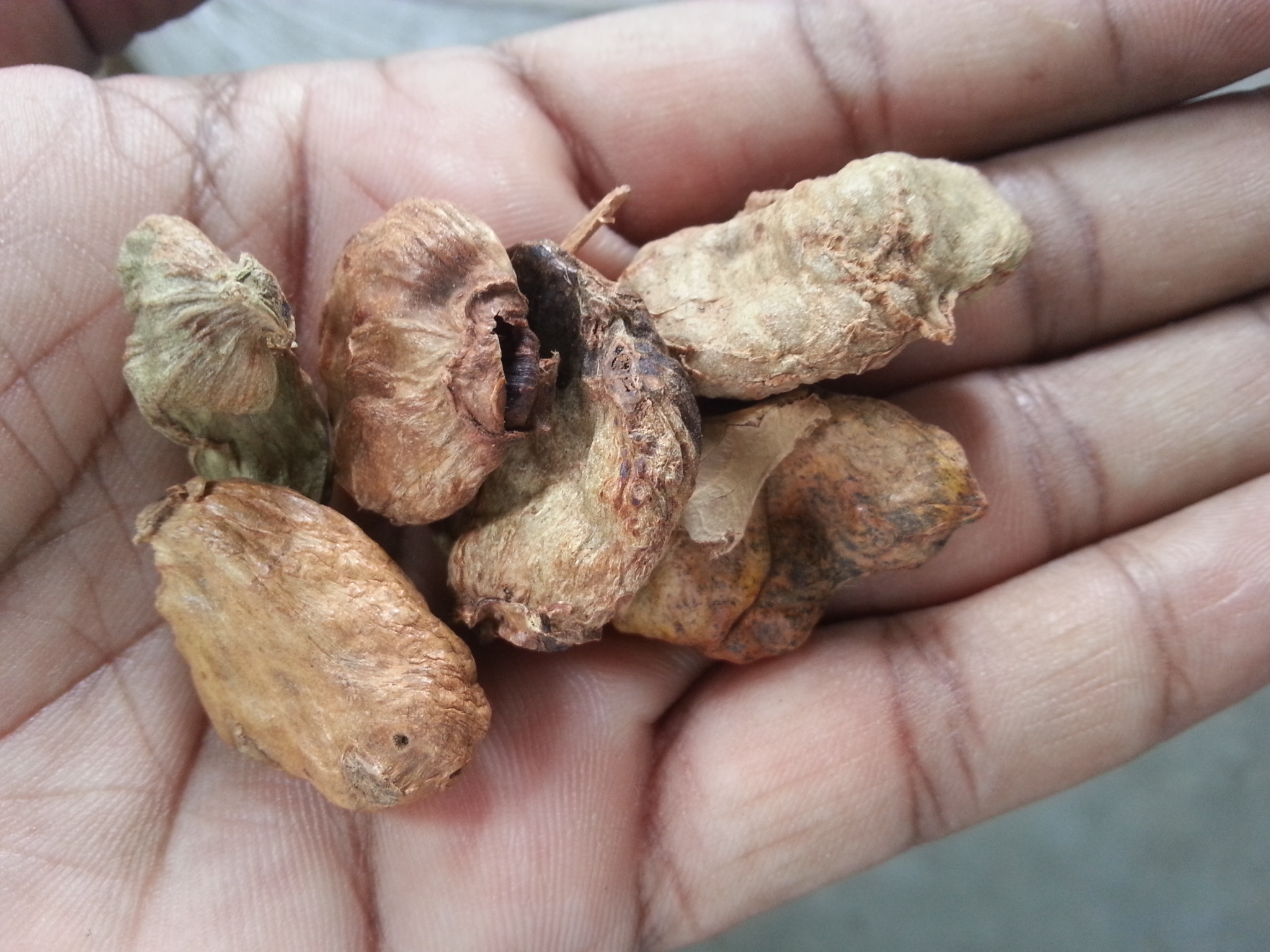
Galls of Pistacia
