= Nopol =

- (−)-Nopol

Names
- IUPAC name 2-(6,6-Dimethylbicyclo[3.1.1]hept-2-en-2-yl)ethanol
- Other names: Nopyl alcohol; 6,6-Dimethyl-2-norpinene-2-ethanol; 10-Hydroxymethylene-2-pinene

Identifiers
CAS Number	128-50-7; (−): 35836-73-8
3D model (JSmol)	Interactive image; (−): Interactive image
ChEBI	(−): CHEBI:171826
ChEMBL	ChEMBL257332
ChemSpider	29138; (−): 1068002
ECHA InfoCard	100.004.447
EC Number	204-890-3
PubChem CID	31408; (−): 23619823; (+): 2723711
UNII	XK8HU7WJQC
CompTox Dashboard (EPA)	DTXSID10861780
- InChI: InChI=1S/C11H18O/c1-11(2)9-4-3-8(5-6-12)10(11)7-9/h3,9-10,12H,4-7H2,1-2H3 Key: ROKSAUSPJGWCSM-UHFFFAOYSA-N; (−): InChI=1S/C11H18O/c1-11(2)9-4-3-8(5-6-12)10(11)7-9/h3,9-10,12H,4-7H2,1-2H3/t9?,10-/m0/s1 Key: ROKSAUSPJGWCSM-AXDSSHIGSA-N
- SMILES: CC1(C2CC1C(=C2)CCO)C; (−): C(CO)C=1[C@]2(C(C)(C)[C@](C2)(CC1)

Properties
Chemical formula	C_{11}H_{18}O
Molar mass	166.264 g·mol^{−1}
Appearance	Colorless viscous liquid
Boiling point	230 °C (446 °F; 503 K)
Solubility in water	Insoluble
Solubility in alcohol and oils	Soluble

Hazards
- GHS labelling
Pictograms	(GHS07: Exclamation mark)
Signal word	Warning
Hazard statements	H302, H315, H317, H319, H412
Precautionary statements	P261, P264, P264+P265, P270, P272, P273, P280, P301+P317, P302+P352, P305+P351+P338, P321, P330, P333+P317, P337+P317, P362+P364, P501
Flash point	99 °C (210 °F; 372 K)
- Lethal dose or concentration (LD, LC)
LD_{50} (median dose)	890 mg/kg (rat, oral)
- Except where otherwise noted, data are given for materials in their standard state (at 25 °C [77 °F], 100 kPa). Infobox references

Nopol is a semi-synthetic bicyclic monoterpenoid alcohol with the molecular formula C_{11}H_{18}O. It is a colorless viscous liquid at room temperature. Nopol has a woody, camphoraceous odor and is used in fragrances and flavorings. As a chiral compound, it can exist in either of two enantiomeric forms, (−)-nopol and (+)-nopol.

== Synthesis ==
Nopol is typically synthesized via the Prins reaction of β-pinene with paraformaldehyde. Syntheses using materials such as tin silicate catalysts have also been reported for selective production.

== Uses ==
Nopol is used in the fragrance industry for its balsamic, pine-like scent in soaps, detergents, and household products. It serves as an intermediate in the synthesis of pesticides and agrochemicals. Derivatives of nopol, such as nopyl acetate, are employed in perfumery and as fuel additives. Nopol and its derivatives exhibit antifungal, insecticidal, and other bioactivities.
