= Pistacia khinjuk =

Conservation status
- Least Concern (IUCN 3.1)

Scientific classification
- Kingdom: Plantae
- Clade: Tracheophytes
- Clade: Angiosperms
- Clade: Eudicots
- Clade: Rosids
- Order: Sapindales
- Family: Anacardiaceae
- Genus: Pistacia
- Species: P. khinjuk

Binomial name
- Pistacia khinjuk Stocks, 1852

Species of plant

Pistacia khinjuk is a species of plant in the family Anacardiaceae native to Egypt, western Asia and parts of the Himalayas. The tree grows up to 10 metres. The epithet comes from the name for the plant in Balochistan, khinjuk (خنجک).
