= Pistacia eurycarpa =

Conservation status
- Least Concern (IUCN 3.1)

Scientific classification
- Kingdom: Plantae
- Clade: Tracheophytes
- Clade: Angiosperms
- Clade: Eudicots
- Clade: Rosids
- Order: Sapindales
- Family: Anacardiaceae
- Genus: Pistacia
- Species: P. eurycarpa

Binomial name
- Pistacia eurycarpa Yalt.

Synonyms
- Pistacia atlantica var. kurdica Zohary; Pistacia atlantica subsp. kurdica (Zohary) Rech.f.

Species of plant

Pistacia eurycarpa, commonly as Persian turpentine tree, is a species of Pistacia native to southeastern Turkey, northern Iraq, Iran, Armenia, and Antilebanon. It is called qezwan (قەزوان) or dareben (دارەبەن) in Kurdish. It is morphologically close to Pistacia atlantica subsp. mutica, but differs by having distinctly compressed fruits (width larger than length).

Having a watery flavour, its resin is used as a chewing gum to relieve upper abdominal discomfort, stomach aches, dyspepsia and peptic ulcer.
