= Verbenol =

(+)-cis-verbenol
(-)-cis-verbenol
(+)-trans-verbenol
(-)-trans-verbenol

Names
- Preferred IUPAC name 4,6,6-Trimethylbicyclo[3.1.1]hept-3-en-2-ol
- Other names 2-Pine-4-ol; Pin-2-en-4-ol

Identifiers
CAS Number	473-67-6
3D model (JSmol)	Interactive image
ChEBI	CHEBI:167399
ChemSpider	55074
ECHA InfoCard	100.006.793
EC Number	207-470-8
PubChem CID	61126
UNII	G0F32F922S
CompTox Dashboard (EPA)	DTXSID2042511
- InChI: InChI=1/C10H16O/c1-6-4-9(11)8-5-7(6)10(8,2)3/h4,7-9,11H,5H2,1-3H3 Key: WONIGEXYPVIKFS-UHFFFAOYSA-N
- SMILES: CC1=CC(C2CC1C2(C)C)O

Properties
Chemical formula	C_{10}H_{16}O
Molar mass	152.237 g·mol^{−1}
- Except where otherwise noted, data are given for materials in their standard state (at 25 °C [77 °F], 100 kPa). Infobox references

Verbenol (2-pine-4-ol) is a group of stereoisomeric bicyclic monoterpene alcohols. These compounds have been found to be active components of insect pheromones and essential oils.

== Isomers ==
Four stereoisomers of verbenol are known. For the cis isomer, the two methyl groups (-CH_{3}) are on the same side of the carbon ring as the hydroxy group (-OH), and for the trans isomer, they are on the opposite sides. Again, there are enantiomers of each form that exhibit optical activity, that is, turn the plane of linearly polarized light as it passes through the substance or its solution. trans-Verbenol is a mountain pine beetle pheromone that attracts insects to a tree. cis-Verbenol is an aggregation pheromone of Ips typographus and Dendroctonus ponderosae Hopkins.

== Enantiomeric composition ==
Typically, verbenol and related cyclic monoterpenes are available as non‐racemic mixtures of their enantiomers. There are methods to increase enantiomeric excess (optical purity) of verbenol and to isolate individual enantiomers.
