= Pinocarveol =

Chemical compound

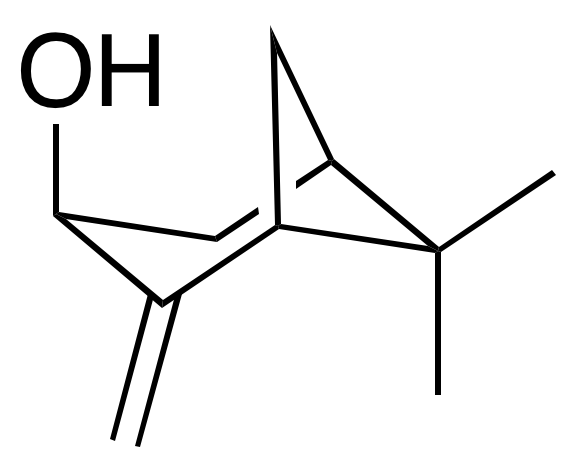
cis-Pinocarveol
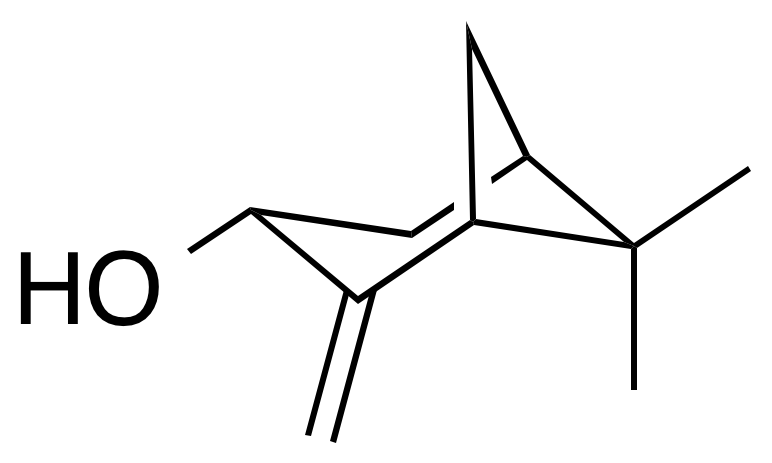
trans-Pinocarveol

Names
- IUPAC name 6,6-dimethyl-2-methylidenebicyclo[3.1.1]heptan-3-ol
- Other names 6,6-Dimethyl-2-methylenebicyclo[3.1.1]heptan-3-ol; 10-pinen-3-ol Isopinocarveol (1S,3R,5S)-2(10)-Pinen-3-ol

Identifiers
CAS Number	5947-36-4; (cis): 3917-59-7; (trans): 19889-99-7
3D model (JSmol)	Interactive image; (cis): Interactive image; (trans): Interactive image
ChemSpider	(cis): 79657; (trans): 79661
ECHA InfoCard	100.025.187
PubChem CID	102667; (cis): 10931630; (trans): 88297
UNII	0WG2C7KI43
CompTox Dashboard (EPA)	DTXSID30863660
- InChI: InChI=1S/C10H16O/c1-6-8-4-7(5-9(6)11)10(8,2)3/h7-9,11H,1,4-5H2,2-3H3 Key: LCYXQUJDODZYIJ-UHFFFAOYSA-N; (cis): InChI=1S/C10H16O/c1-6-8-4-7(5-9(6)11)10(8,2)3/h7-9,11H,1,4-5H2,2-3H3/t7-,8+,9-/m1/s1 Key: LCYXQUJDODZYIJ-HRDYMLBCSA-N; (trans): InChI=1S/C10H16O/c1-6-8-4-7(5-9(6)11)10(8,2)3/h7-9,11H,1,4-5H2,2-3H3/t7-,8+,9-/m0/s1 Key: LCYXQUJDODZYIJ-YIZRAAEISA-N
- SMILES: CC1(C2CC1C(=C)C(C2)O)C; (cis): CC1(C)[C@H]2C[C@@H]1C[C@@H](O)C2=C; (trans): CC1(C)[C@@H]2C[C@H]1C[C@H](O)C2=C

Properties
Chemical formula	C_{10}H_{16}O
Molar mass	152.237 g·mol^{−1}
Appearance	Light yellow viscous liquid
Odor	woody
Density	0.9730 g/cm^{3}
Boiling point	217 °C (423 °F; 490 K)
Solubility in water	Insoluble in water
Solubility	Soluble in ethanol, soluble in oils

Hazards
NFPA 704 (fire diamond)	0 2 0
Flash point	90.1°C
- Except where otherwise noted, data are given for materials in their standard state (at 25 °C [77 °F], 100 kPa). Infobox references

Pinocarveol is an organic compound with the formula C_{10}H_{16}O. It is a bicyclic monoterpenoid, which is a combination of two isoprene units with one hydroxyl group as a substituent. It exists as either trans- or cis-pinocarveol, referring to stereochemical orientation of the oxygen as compared to the methylene bridge. It is a naturally occurring molecule in numerous plant species including Eucalyptus globulus and Picea abies. Pinocarveol is found in a variety of essential oils.

== Synthesis ==
Pinocarveol can be synthesized by heating a mixture of turpentine, selenium dioxide, and hydrogen peroxide. The selenium dioxide acts as a catalyst while the hydrogen peroxide oxidizes the pinene found in turpentine. The other products in the turpentine are left unreacted.

== Use ==
Pinocarveol is used as a food flavoring. In the European Union it is designated Fl 02.100.
