= Lavender oil =

Essential oil distilled from lavender flower spikes

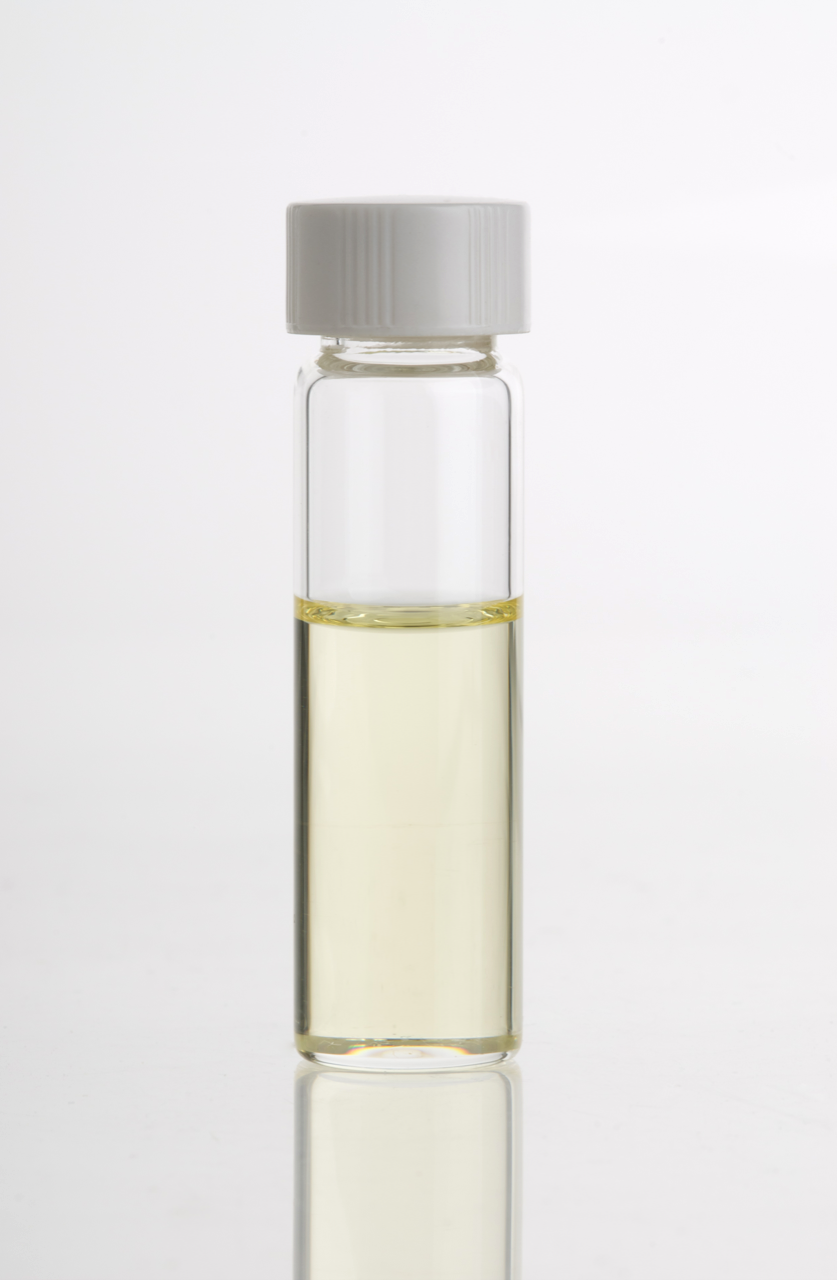
A glass vial of lavender oil

Lavender oil is an essential oil obtained by distillation from the flower spikes of certain species of lavender. It is commonly used in aromatherapy, perfumery, and as a flavoring or fragrance in consumer products.

There are over 400 types of lavender worldwide with different scents and qualities. Two forms of lavender oil are distinguished, lavender flower oil, a colorless oil, insoluble in water, having a density of 0.885 g/mL; and lavender spike oil, a distillate from the herb Lavandula latifolia, having a density of 0.905 g/mL. Like all essential oils, it is not a pure compound; it is a complex mixture of phytochemicals, including linalool and linalyl acetate.

Lavender oil has been used in perfumes, aromatherapy, massage therapy, and topical skin applications, though these uses lack strong clinical evidence of effectiveness. It may cause allergic reactions in massage therapy. Although generally recognized as safe, lavender oil may act as an endocrine disruptor, is toxic if ingested, especially for children, and can cause poisoning symptoms, skin irritation, and drug interactions.

Historically, spike lavender oil was used as a solvent in oil painting before turpentine became common. Lavender oil is primarily produced through steam distillation of harvested lavender blooms—typically between late June and August—with leading global producers including Bulgaria, France, and China. Lavender oil is among the most commonly adulterated essential oils.

A standardized oral preparation known as Silexan is also used for the treatment of anxiety disorders. Silexan is approved in Germany for anxiety-related restlessness and has shown clinical effectiveness in reducing anxiety symptoms while generally being considered safe. In the US, Silexan is marketed under the name CalmAid.

== Production ==
Pure lavender essential oil is produced through steam distillation. This generates a greater amount of oil compared to other methods due to reduction of polar compound loss. Harvest of lavender blooms is typically between late June and August. The cut lavender flowers and stems are compacted into a lavender still. A boiler is then used to steam the bottom of the lavender flower filled still at a very low pressure. The lavender flower pockets containing oil are broken from this heating process and a pipe of cold water is run through the center of the still. The hot lavender oil vapor condenses on the cold pipe with the cold water and is collected into a holding tank where it is allowed to settle. Due to polarity and densities of the water and oil, these two will separate in the holding tank whereupon the water is piped out, leaving just lavender essential oil.

Lavender oil is produced around the world, with Bulgaria, France and China leading its production.

== Uses ==
Lavender oil has been used as a perfume, aromatherapy, and skin application, but these uses have no clinical benefit. Lavender oil is used in massage therapy as a way of inducing relaxation through direct skin contact, although allergic reactions may occur. There is no good evidence to support the use of lavender oil aromatherapy for treating dementia.

In Germany, Silexan is approved as a medicine for restlessness associated with anxiety. A 2010 review found that "silexan effectively ameliorates generalized anxiety comparable to a common benzodiazepine (lorazepam)". A 2024 review found that an oral 80 mg dose of Silexan per day reduced symptoms in people with anxiety disorders compared to placebo and is generally considered safe. The effectiveness of using oral lavender oil for treating anxiety remains undetermined. Lavender oil may be useful for treating depression.

Oil of spike lavender was used as a solvent in oil painting, mainly before the use of distilled turpentine became common.

== Adverse effects ==
Although lavender oil is generally recognized as safe for its intended uses, it is a potential endocrine disruptor that may affect breast development in children.

Many essential oils, including lavender oil, can be poisonous if swallowed. In general, 5 millilitres (0.17 US fl oz) of a diluted essential oil may cause toxicity in adults, whereas 2–3 millilitres (0.068–0.101 US fl oz) can be toxic in children. Over 2014-18 in New South Wales, there were 271 reported cases of lavender oil poisoning – mostly in children – accounting for 6.1% of all essential oil poisoning cases. The main toxic constituents of lavender oil are linalyl acetate and linalool.

Symptoms of lavender oil poisoning by ingestion include blurred vision, difficulty breathing, burning pain in the throat, burns to the eye, confusion, decreased level of consciousness, diarrhea, stomach pain, vomiting, and rash. Topical application of lavender oil may cause contact dermatitis.

Ingestion of lavender oil may cause interactions with prescription drugs, including anticoagulants, statins, and anticonvulsants.

== Phytochemicals ==
The phytochemical composition of lavender oil varies from species to species (table), consisting primarily of monoterpeneoid and sesquiterpeneoid alcohols. Linalool (20-35%) and linalyl acetate (30-55%) dominate, with moderate levels of lavandulyl acetate, terpinen-4-ol and lavandulol, 1,8-cineole, camphor, limonene, and tannins. Lavender oil typically contains more than 100 compounds, although many of these are at negligible concentrations.

The composition of lavender essential oil as obtained by chromatography:

| Family | Composition | Lavande officinale Lavandula angustifolia | Lavande aspic Lavandula latifolia |
|---|---|---|---|
| Terpenes / Monoterpenols | Linalool | 28.92 % | 49.47 % |
| Terpenes / Monoterpenols | α-Terpineol | 0.90% | 1.08% |
| Terpenes / Monoterpenols | γ-Terpineol | | 0.09% |
| Terpenes / Monoterpenols | Borneol | | 1.43% |
| Terpenes / Monoterpenols | Isoborneol | | 0.82% |
| Terpenes / Monoterpenols | Terpinen-4-ol | 4.32% | |
| Terpenes / Monoterpenols | Nerol | 0.20% | |
| Terpenes / Monoterpenols | Lavandulol | 0.78% | |
| Terpenes / Terpene esters | Linalyl acetate | 32.98 % | |
| Terpenes / Terpene esters | Geranyl acetate | 0.60% | |
| Terpenes / Terpene esters | Neryl acetate | 0.32% | |
| Terpenes / Terpene esters | Octene-3-yl acetate | 0.65% | |
| Terpenes / Terpene esters | Lavandulyl acetate | 4.52% | |
| Terpenes / Monoterpenes | Myrcene | 0.46% | 0.41% |
| Terpenes / Monoterpenes | α-Pinene | | 0.54% |
| Terpenes / Monoterpenes | β-Pinene | | 0.33% |
| Terpenes / Monoterpenes | Camphene | | 0.30% |
| Terpenes / Monoterpenes | (E)-β-Ocimene | 3.09% | |
| Terpenes / Monoterpenes | (Z)-β-Ocimene | 4.44% | |
| Terpenes / Monoterpenes | β-Phellandrene | 0.12% | |
| Terpenes / Terpenoid oxides | Eucalyptol (1,8-cineol) | | 25.91 % |
| Terpenes / Sesquiterpenes | β-Caryophyllene | 4.62% | 2.10% |
| Terpenes / Sesquiterpenes | β-Farnesene | 2.73% | |
| Terpenes / Sesquiterpenes | Germacrene | 0.27% | |
| Terpenes / Sesquiterpenes | α-Humulene | | 0.28% |
| Ketones | Camphor | 0.85% | 13.00 % |
| Ketones | 3-Octanone | 0.72% | |
| Ketones | Cryptone | 0.35% | |

== Adulteration ==
Lavender oil is among the most commonly adulterated essential oils.
