= C12H20O2 =

The molecular formula C_{12}H_{20}O_{2} (molar mass: 196.29 g/mol) may refer to:

- Bornyl acetate
- Ethyl decadienoate
- Geranyl acetate
- Lavandulyl acetate
- Linalyl acetate
- Neryl acetate
