= Merrifieldia malacodactylus =

Scientific classification
- Kingdom: Animalia
- Phylum: Arthropoda
- Class: Insecta
- Order: Lepidoptera
- Family: Pterophoridae
- Genus: Merrifieldia
- Species: M. malacodactylus

Binomial name
- Merrifieldia malacodactylus (Zeller, 1847)

Synonyms
- List: Pterophorus malacodactylus Zeller, 1847; Pterophorus meristodactylus Zeller, 1852; Alucita indocta Meyrick, 1913; Alucita subtilis Caradja, 1920; Alucita parca Meyrick, 1921; Alucita subcretosa Meyrick, 1922; Alucita phaeoschista Meyrick, 1923; Alucita spicidactyla Chrétien, 1923; Alucita rayatella Amsel, 1959; Aciptilia spicidactyla insularis Bigot, 1961; Aciptilia livadiensis Zagulajev & Filippova, 1976; Pterophorus malacodactylus trasdanubinus Fazekas, 1986; Merrifieldia garrigae Bigot & Picard, 1989; Merrifieldia moulignieri Nel, 1991; Merrifieldia inopinata Bigot, Nel & Picard, 1993

Species of plume moth

Merrifieldia malacodactylus is a moth of the family Pterophoridae. It is known from Central Asia, Yemen, Mediterranean Europe, Tunisia, Morocco, Anatolia, Syria, Iran, Afghanistan, Iraq, Lebanon, the Palestinian Territories and Russia.

Adults are variable.

The larvae feed on Origanum vulgare, Thymus herba-barona, Lavandula stoechas, Lavandula angustifolia, Lavandula latifolia, Calamintha nepeta, Rosmarius officinalis and Nepeta nepetellae.
