= (−)-Borneol dehydrogenase =

Class of enzymes

(−)-borneol dehydrogenase

Identifiers
- EC no.: 1.1.1.227
- CAS no.: 111940-48-8

Databases
- IntEnz: IntEnz view
- BRENDA: BRENDA entry
- ExPASy: NiceZyme view
- KEGG: KEGG entry
- MetaCyc: metabolic pathway
- PRIAM: profile
- PDB structures: RCSB PDB PDBe PDBsum
- Gene Ontology: AmiGO / QuickGO
Search
- PMC: articles
- PubMed: articles
- NCBI: proteins

In enzymology, a (−)-borneol dehydrogenase (EC 1.1.1.227) is an enzyme that catalyzes the chemical reaction

(−)-borneol + NAD^{+} $\rightleftharpoons$ (−)-camphor + NADH + H^{+}

Thus, the two substrates of this enzyme are (−)-borneol and NAD^{+}, whereas its 3 products are (−)-camphor, NADH, and H^{+}.

This enzyme belongs to the family of oxidoreductases, specifically those acting on the CH-OH group of donor with NAD^{+} or NADP^{+} as acceptor. The systematic name of this enzyme class is (−)-borneol:NAD^{+} oxidoreductase.
