= (+)-Borneol dehydrogenase =

Class of enzymes

(+)-borneol dehydrogenase

Identifiers
- EC no.: 1.1.1.198
- CAS no.: 67185-75-5

Databases
- IntEnz: IntEnz view
- BRENDA: BRENDA entry
- ExPASy: NiceZyme view
- KEGG: KEGG entry
- MetaCyc: metabolic pathway
- PRIAM: profile
- PDB structures: RCSB PDB PDBe PDBsum
- Gene Ontology: AmiGO / QuickGO
Search
- PMC: articles
- PubMed: articles
- NCBI: proteins

In enzymology, (+)-borneol dehydrogenase (EC 1.1.1.198) is an enzyme that catalyzes, the chemical reaction

(+)-borneol
+ NAD^{+}
H^{+}
H^{+}
(+)-camphor
+ NADH

The two substrates of this enzyme are (+)-borneol and oxidised nicotinamide adenine dinucleotide (NAD^{+}). Its products are (+)-camphor, reduced NADH, and a proton.

This enzyme belongs to the family of oxidoreductases, specifically those acting on the CH-OH group of donor with NAD^{+} or NADP^{+} as acceptor. The systematic name of this enzyme class is (+)-borneol:NAD^{+} oxidoreductase. This enzyme is also called bicyclic monoterpenol dehydrogenase.
