= Streptomyces tunisialbus =

Scientific classification
- Domain: Bacteria
- Kingdom: Bacillati
- Phylum: Actinomycetota
- Class: Actinomycetia
- Order: Streptomycetales
- Family: Streptomycetaceae
- Genus: Streptomyces
- Species: S. tunisialbus

Binomial name
- Streptomyces tunisialbus Ayed et al. 2020

Type strain
- S2

Species of bacterium

Streptomyces tunisialbus is a bacterium species from the genus of Streptomyces which has been isolated from rhizosphereic soil of a Lavandula officinalis plant.

== See also ==
- List of Streptomyces species
