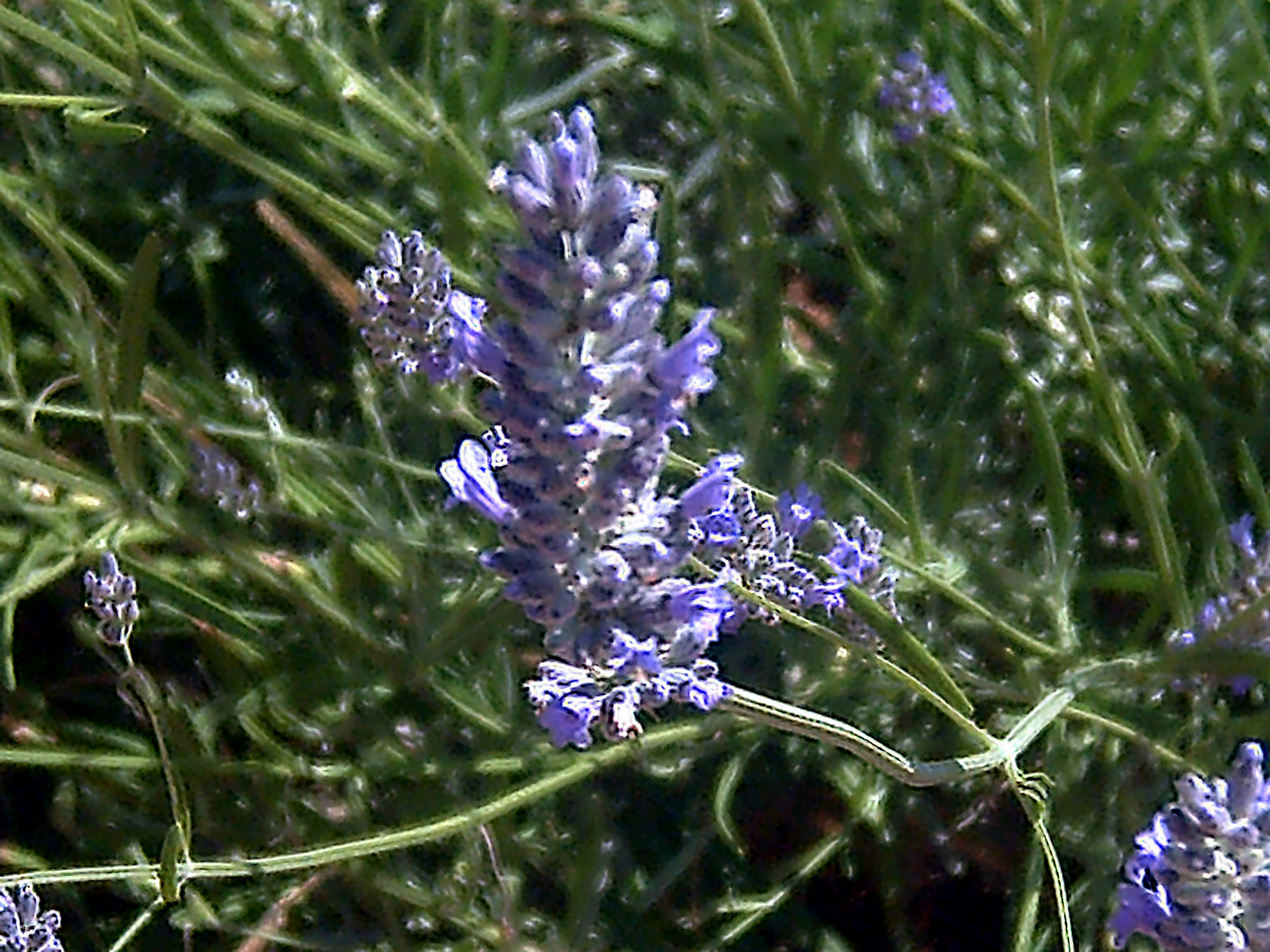

Conservation status
- Least Concern (IUCN 3.1)

Scientific classification
- Kingdom: Plantae
- Clade: Embryophytes
- Clade: Tracheophytes
- Clade: Angiosperms
- Clade: Eudicots
- Clade: Asterids
- Order: Lamiales
- Family: Lamiaceae
- Genus: Lavandula
- Species: L. latifolia

Binomial name
- Lavandula latifolia Medik.

Synonyms
- Lavandula spica subsp. latifolia Bonnier & Layens [1894]; Lavandula latifolia var. tomentosa Briq. [1895]; Lavandula latifolia var. erigens (Jord. & Fourr.) Rouy [1909]; Lavandula interrupta Jord. & Fourr. [1868]; Lavandula inclinans Jord. & Fourr. [1868]; Lavandula guinandii Gand. [1875]; Lavandula erigens Jord. & Fourr. [1868]; Lavandula decipiens Gand. [1875]; Lavandula cladophora Gand.; Nard rustique, italien Panckoucke, Dictionnaire des sciences médicales, vol. 35 [1819]

= Lavandula latifolia =

Lavandula latifolia Spike lavender

Species of flowering plant

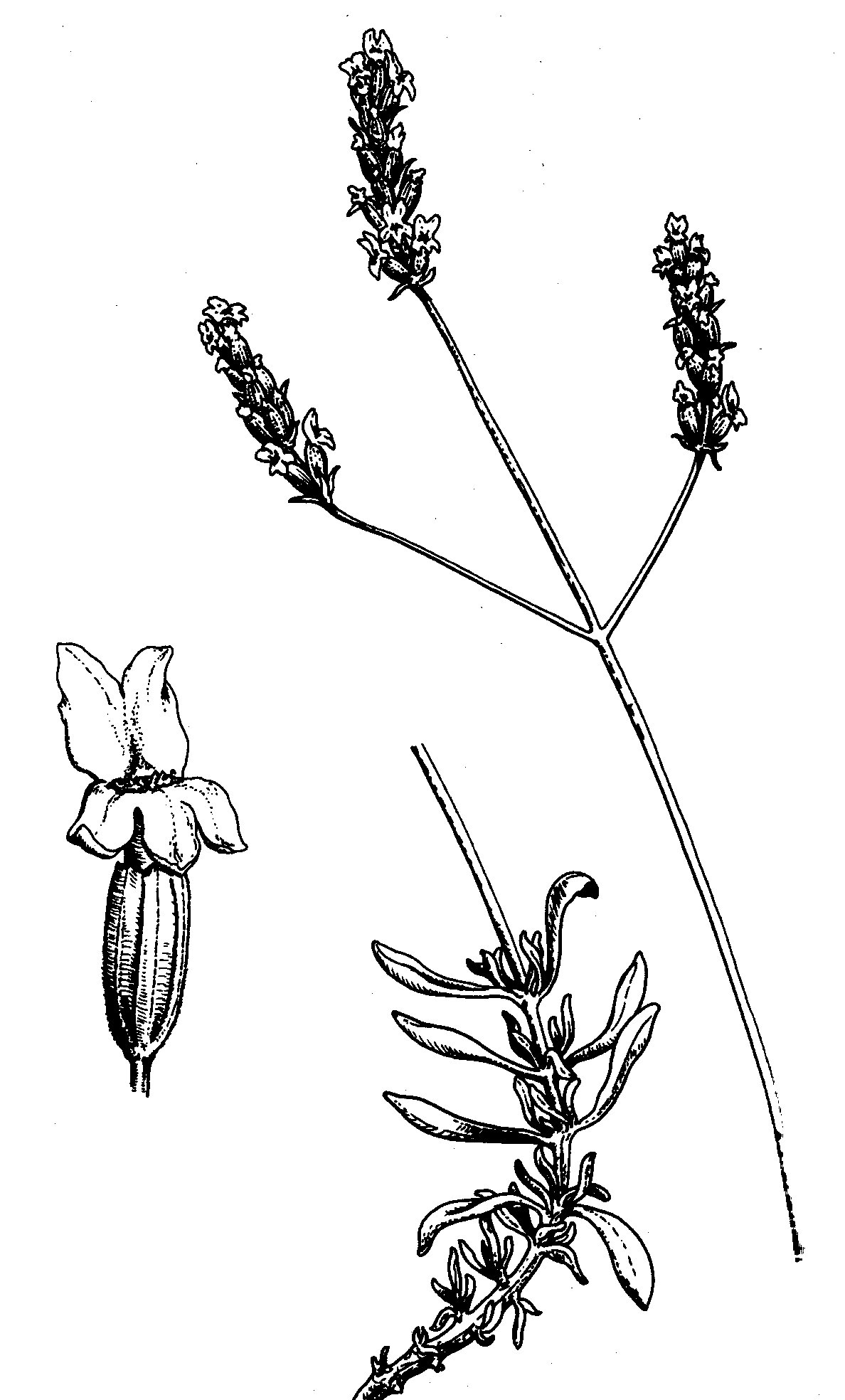
Lavandula latifolia.

Lavandula latifolia, known as broadleaved lavender, spike lavender, aspic lavender or Portuguese lavender, is a flowering plant in the family Lamiaceae, native to the western Mediterranean basin. Hybridization can occur in the wild with English lavender (Lavandula angustifolia).

The scent of Lavandula latifolia is stronger, with more camphor, and more pungent than Lavandula angustifolia scent.

== Description ==
Lavandula latifolia is a strongly aromatic shrub growing to 30–80 cm tall. The leaves are evergreen, 3–6 cm long and 5–8 mm broad.

The flowers are pale lilac, produced on spikes 2–5 cm long at the top of slender, leafless stems 20–50 cm long. Flowers from June to September, depending on weather.

The fruit is a nut, indehiscent, monosperm of hardened pericarp. It consists of four small nuts which often remain locked inside the calyx tube. Grows from 0 to 1,700 m amsl.

== Etymology ==
The species name latifolia is Latin for "broadleaf". The genus name Lavandula simply means lavender.

== Chemical composition ==
- Camphor (10.8–23.2%)
- Eucalyptol (28.0–34.9%)
- Borneol (0.9–3.6%)
- α-Pinene(? %)
- β-Pinene(0.8–2.6%)
- Caryophyllene (0.5–1.9%)
- Camphene(0.4–0.6%)
- Guaiazulene (? %)
- Linalool (27.2–43.1%)
- Geraniol (? %)
- Limonene (0.2–0.9%)

== Uses ==
Lavandula latifolia can be used in aromatherapy.

== Bibliography ==
- Blumenthal M, Goldberg A, Brinckmann J. (2000). Herbal Medicine: Expanded Commission E Monographs, First Edition. Newton, Mass.: Integrative Medicine Communications. ISBN 978-0967077215. OCLC 865511587.
- Grases F, Melero G, Costa-Bauza A, March JG (September 1994). "Urolithiasis and Phytotherapy" (subscription required). Int Urol Nephrol; 26(5): 507–511. doi:10.1007/BF02767650.
- [Medical Economics Company] (2000). PDR for Herbal Medicines. Second Edition. Montvale, NJ: Medical Economics Company. ISBN 9781563633614. OCLC 44060058.
- Paris RR, Moyse H. (1971). Matière Médicale. Tome [Vol.] III: Pharmacognosie spéciale, Dicotylédones (suite) : Gamopétales. Masson & Cie., Paris. OCLC 728336063.
