= Isobornyl acetate =

Organic compound with a pine-like scent

Names
- IUPAC name [(1S,2S,4S)-1,7,7-trimethyl-2-bicyclo[2.2.1]heptanyl] acetate

Identifiers
CAS Number	125-12-2 (+)
3D model (JSmol)	Interactive image
ChemSpider	5323219
ECHA InfoCard	100.004.298
EC Number	204-727-6
PubChem CID	6950273
RTECS number	NP7350000
UNII	54T6CCU09Z
CompTox Dashboard (EPA)	DTXSID7042061
- InChI: InChI=1S/C12H20O2/c1-8(13)14-10-7-9-5-6-12(10,4)11(9,2)3/h9-10H,5-7H2,1-4H3/t9-,10-,12+/m0/s1 Key: KGEKLUUHTZCSIP-JBLDHEPKSA-N
- SMILES: CC(=O)O[C@H]1C[C@@H]2CC[C@]1(C2(C)C)C

Properties
Chemical formula	C_{12}H_{20}O_{2}
Molar mass	196.290 g·mol^{−1}
Appearance	colorless liquid
Density	0.9841 g/cm^{3}
Boiling point	102–103 °C (216–217 °F; 375–376 K) 13 torr
- Except where otherwise noted, data are given for materials in their standard state (at 25 °C [77 °F], 100 kPa). Infobox references

Isobornyl acetate is an organic compound consisting of the acetate ester or the terpenoid isoborneol. It is a colorless liquid with a pleasant pine-like scent, and it is produced on a multi-ton scale for this purpose. The compound is prepared by reaction of camphene with acetic acid in the presence of a strongly acidic catalyst such as sulfuric acid. Hydrolysis of isobornyl acetate gives isoborneol, a precursor to camphor.

Like many plant exudates, isobornyl acetate appears to have antifeedant properties.
