= Lavandulol =

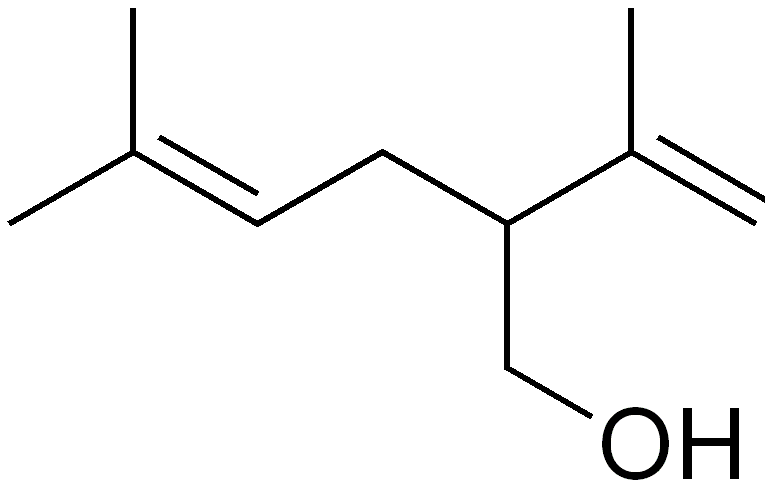

Names
- Preferred IUPAC name 5-Methyl-2-(prop-1-en-2-yl)hex-4-en-1-ol
- Other names 2-Isopropenyl-5-methyl-4-hexen-1-ol

Identifiers
CAS Number	58461-27-1; 498-16-8 (R)-(−); 50373-53-0 (S)-(+)
3D model (JSmol)	(±): Interactive image; (R)-(−): Interactive image; (S)-(+): Interactive image
ChEBI	CHEBI:50281
ChemSpider	84888 (±); 4576557 (R)-(−); 61441 (S)-(+)
ECHA InfoCard	100.055.676
EC Number	261-264-2
PubChem CID	94060 (±); 5464156 (R)-(−); 68133 (S)-(+)
UNII	1YPC7F65XU; T2QB7QHN63 (R)-(−); 8PLA23B8JZ (S)-(+)
CompTox Dashboard (EPA)	DTXSID70866690
- InChI: (±): InChI=1S/C10H18O/c1-8(2)5-6-10(7-11)9(3)4/h5,10-11H,3,6-7H2,1-2,4H3 Key: CZVXBFUKBZRMKR-UHFFFAOYSA-N; (R)-(−): InChI=1S/C10H18O/c1-8(2)5-6-10(7-11)9(3)4/h5,10-11H,3,6-7H2,1-2,4H3/t10-/m0/s1 Key: CZVXBFUKBZRMKR-JTQLQIEISA-N; (S)-(+): InChI=1S/C10H18O/c1-8(2)5-6-10(7-11)9(3)4/h5,10-11H,3,6-7H2,1-2,4H3/t10-/m1/s1 Key: CZVXBFUKBZRMKR-SNVBAGLBSA-N
- SMILES: (±): CC(=CCC(CO)C(=C)C)C; (R)-(−): CC(=CC[C@@H](CO)C(=C)C)C; (S)-(+): CC(=CC[C@H](CO)C(=C)C)C

Properties
Chemical formula	C_{10}H_{18}O
Molar mass	154.253 g·mol^{−1}
Appearance	Clear colorless liquid
Density	0.878 g/mL at 20 °C
- Except where otherwise noted, data are given for materials in their standard state (at 25 °C [77 °F], 100 kPa). Infobox references

Lavandulol is a monoterpene alcohol found in a variety of essential oils such as lavender oil. The term refers to either of two enantiomers. The (R)-enantiomer is natural and has an aroma described as "weak floral, herbal odor with slightly lemon-like, fresh citrus fruity nuance"; the (S)-enantiomer has only a weak odor.

Lavandulol and its esters are used in the perfume industry and have been identified as insect pheromones.

== See also ==
- Lavandulyl acetate
