= Ethyl decadienoate =

Names
- Preferred IUPAC name Ethyl (2E,4Z)-deca-2,4-dienoate
- Other names Ethyl (2E,4Z)-2,4-decadienoate; Pear ester Ethyl 2-trans-4-cis-decadienoate

Identifiers
CAS Number	3025-30-7
3D model (JSmol)	Interactive image
ChEBI	CHEBI:4896
ChemSpider	4444602
ECHA InfoCard	100.019.254
PubChem CID	5281162
UNII	79P6KS9Y5Z
CompTox Dashboard (EPA)	DTXSID0041357
- InChI: InChI=1S/C12H20O2/c1-3-5-6-7-8-9-10-11-12(13)14-4-2/h8-11H,3-7H2,1-2H3/b9-8-,11-10+ Key: OPCRGEVPIBLWAY-QNRZBPGKSA-N; InChI=1/C12H20O2/c1-3-5-6-7-8-9-10-11-12(13)14-4-2/h8-11H,3-7H2,1-2H3/b9-8-,11-10+ Key: OPCRGEVPIBLWAY-QNRZBPGKBN
- SMILES: O=C(OCC)\C=C\C=C/CCCCC

Properties
Chemical formula	C_{12}H_{20}O_{2}
Molar mass	196.290 g·mol^{−1}
Appearance	Colorless liquid
Boiling point	70–72 °C (158–162 °F; 343–345 K): (0.05 mmHg); 81–82 °C (178–180 °F) (0.1 mmHg); 83–88 °C (181–190 °F) (0.1 mmHg)
Solubility in water	8.588 mg/L (est.)

Hazards
Flash point	113 °C (235 °F)
- Except where otherwise noted, data are given for materials in their standard state (at 25 °C [77 °F], 100 kPa). Infobox references

Ethyl decadienoate, also known as pear ester, is an organic chemical compound used in flavors and perfumery for its pear-like taste and odor.

== Occurrence and preparation ==
Ethyl decadienoate is found in apples, Bartlett pears, Concord grapes, beer, pear brandy and quince.

It can also be prepared synthetically from 1-octyn-3-ol or from ethyl propiolate.

== Uses ==
Ethyl decadienoate is used in natural flavors and fragrances for its intense fruity flavor. In the United States, as a food additive it is listed as generally recognized as safe (GRAS).
