= Isoborneol =

Names
- IUPAC names +: (1S,2S,4S)-1,7,7-trimethylbicyclo[2.2.1]heptane-2-ol -: (1R,2R,4R)-1,7,7-trimethylbicyclo[2.2.1]heptane-2-ol

Identifiers
CAS Number	+: 16725-71-6 d; -: 10334-13-1; rac: 124-76-5
3D model (JSmol)	+: Interactive image; -: Interactive image; rac: Interactive image
ChEBI	+: CHEBI:191949
ChEMBL	+: ChEMBL4294644; -: ChEMBL3560760
ChemSpider	+: 16739225; -: 4882019
ECHA InfoCard	100.004.285
PubChem CID	+: 6973640; -: 6321405
UNII	+: 8GDX32M6KF; -: 20U67Z994U; rac: L88RA8N5EG
UN number	1312
- InChI: +: InChI=1S/C10H18O/c1-9(2)7-4-5-10(9,3)8(11)6-7/h7-8,11H,4-6H2,1-3H3/t7-,8-,10+/m0/s1 Key: DTGKSKDOIYIVQL-OYNCUSHFSA-N; -: InChI=1S/C10H18O/c1-9(2)7-4-5-10(9,3)8(11)6-7/h7-8,11H,4-6H2,1-3H3/t7-,8-,10+/m1/s1 Key: DTGKSKDOIYIVQL-MRTMQBJTSA-N
- SMILES: +: C[C@]12CC[C@H](C1(C)C)C[C@@H]2O; -: C[C@@]12CC[C@@H](C1(C)C)C[C@H]2O; rac: CC1(C2CCC1(C(C2)O)C)C

Properties
Chemical formula	C_{10}H_{18}O
Molar mass	154.253 g·mol^{−1}
Appearance	white or colorless solid
Melting point	212–214 °C (414–417 °F; 485–487 K) + or -; 210–215 °C for rac

Hazards
- GHS labelling
Pictograms	(GHS02: Flammable)
Signal word	Warning
Hazard statements	H228
Precautionary statements	P210, P240, P241, P280, P370+P378
- Except where otherwise noted, data are given for materials in their standard state (at 25 °C [77 °F], 100 kPa). Infobox references

Isoborneol is a bicyclic organic compound and a terpene derivative. The hydroxyl group in this compound is placed in an exo position. The endo diastereomer is called borneol. Being chiral, isoborneol exists as enantiomers.

== Preparation ==
Isoborneol is synthesized commercially by hydrolysis of isobornyl acetate. The latter is obtained from treatment of camphene with acetic acid in the presence of a strong acid catalyst.

It can also be produced by reduction of camphor:

=== Isoborneol derivatives as chiral ligands ===
Derivatives of isoborneol are used as ligands in asymmetric synthesis.

- (2S)-(−)-3-exo-(morpholino)isoborneol or MIB with a morpholine substituent in the α-hydroxyl position.
- (2S)-(−)-3-exo-(dimethylamino)isoborneol or DAIB with a dimethylamino substituent in the α-hydroxyl position
