= Bornane =

Skeletal formula
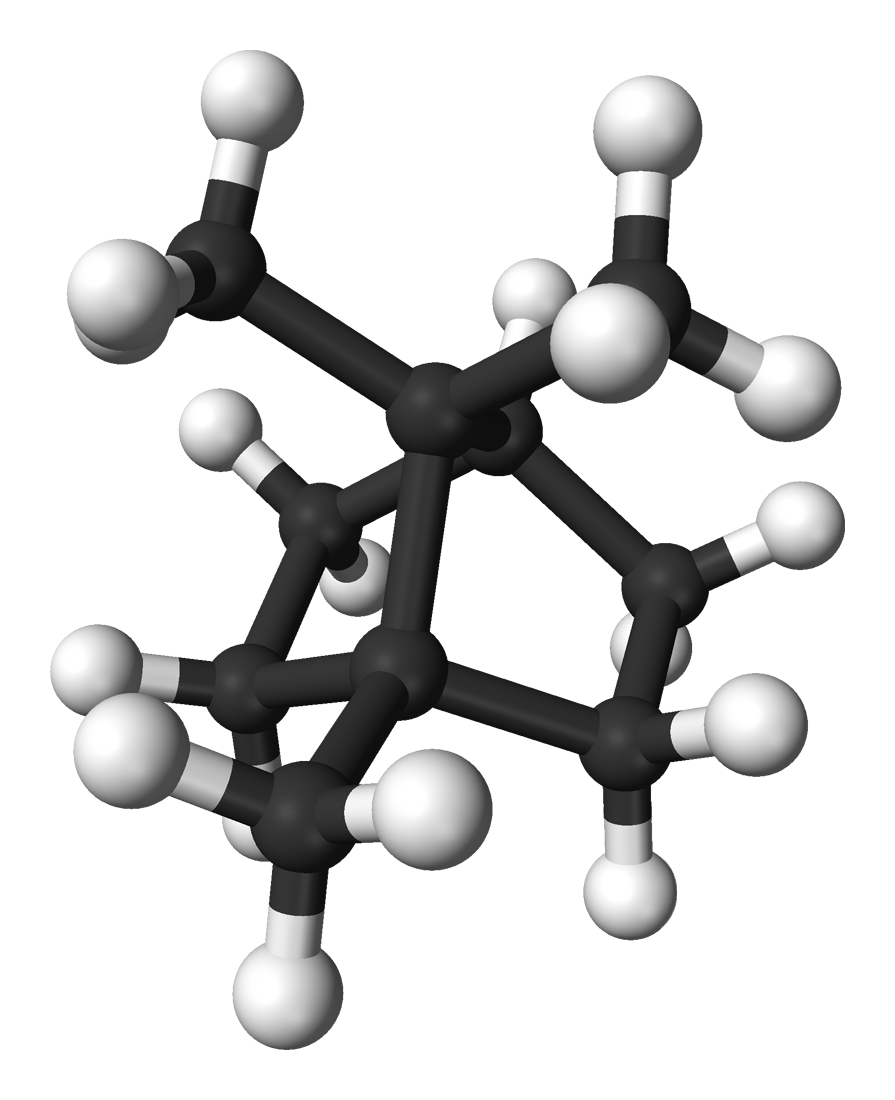
Ball-and-stick model

Names
- IUPAC name (1S,4S)-1,7,7-trimethylbicyclo[2.2.1]heptane

Identifiers
CAS Number	464-15-3
3D model (JSmol)	Interactive image
Beilstein Reference	1900804
ChEBI	CHEBI:35783
ChemSpider	83155
DrugBank	DB04501
PubChem CID	92108
CompTox Dashboard (EPA)	DTXSID60196832
- InChI: InChI=1S/C10H18/c1-9(2)8-4-6-10(9,3)7-5-8/h8H,4-7H2,1-3H3 Key: BEWYHVAWEKZDPP-UHFFFAOYSA-N
- SMILES: CC1(C2CCC1(CC2)C)C

Properties
Chemical formula	C_{10}H_{18}
Molar mass	138.24992
- Except where otherwise noted, data are given for materials in their standard state (at 25 °C [77 °F], 100 kPa). verify (what is ?) Infobox references

Bornane (or camphane) is a compound closely related to norbornane.

Its name refers to Borneo, habitat of the tree Cinnamomum camphora from which bornane and related compounds can be extracted.

== Etymology and natural occurrence ==
The name bornane is derived from Borneo, the island historically associated with natural camphor and borneol obtained from the Borneo camphor tree (Dryobalanops aromatica) and the camphor laurel (Cinnamomum camphora). These plants yield terpenoid compounds, including borneol and camphor, which share the same bicyclic skeleton as bornane. Bornane (also known as camphane) may therefore be regarded as the saturated parent hydrocarbon of camphor and related compounds.

== See also ==
- Camphor
