= Lavandulyl acetate =

Names
- IUPAC name 2-Isopropenyl-5-methyl-4-hexen-1-yl acetate
- Other names 5-Methyl-2-(1-methylethenyl)-4-hexen-1-ol acetate

Identifiers
CAS Number	25905-14-0
3D model (JSmol)	Interactive image
ChemSpider	28088
ECHA InfoCard	100.043.010
PubChem CID	30247
UNII	OU6ZF37MOM
CompTox Dashboard (EPA)	DTXSID30904865 DTXSID6051932, DTXSID30904865
- InChI: InChI=1S/C12H20O2/c1-9(2)6-7-12(10(3)4)8-14-11(5)13/h6,12H,3,7-8H2,1-2,4-5H3 Key: HYNGAVZPWWXQIU-UHFFFAOYSA-N; InChI=1/C12H20O2/c1-9(2)6-7-12(10(3)4)8-14-11(5)13/h6,12H,3,7-8H2,1-2,4-5H3 Key: HYNGAVZPWWXQIU-UHFFFAOYAB
- SMILES: O=C(OCC(\C(=C)C)C/C=C(/C)C)C

Properties
Chemical formula	C_{12}H_{20}O_{2}
Molar mass	196.290 g·mol^{−1}
- Except where otherwise noted, data are given for materials in their standard state (at 25 °C [77 °F], 100 kPa). Infobox references

Lavandulyl acetate is the acetate ester of lavandulol. It is a component of lavender oil.
