= Borneol =

Chemical compound

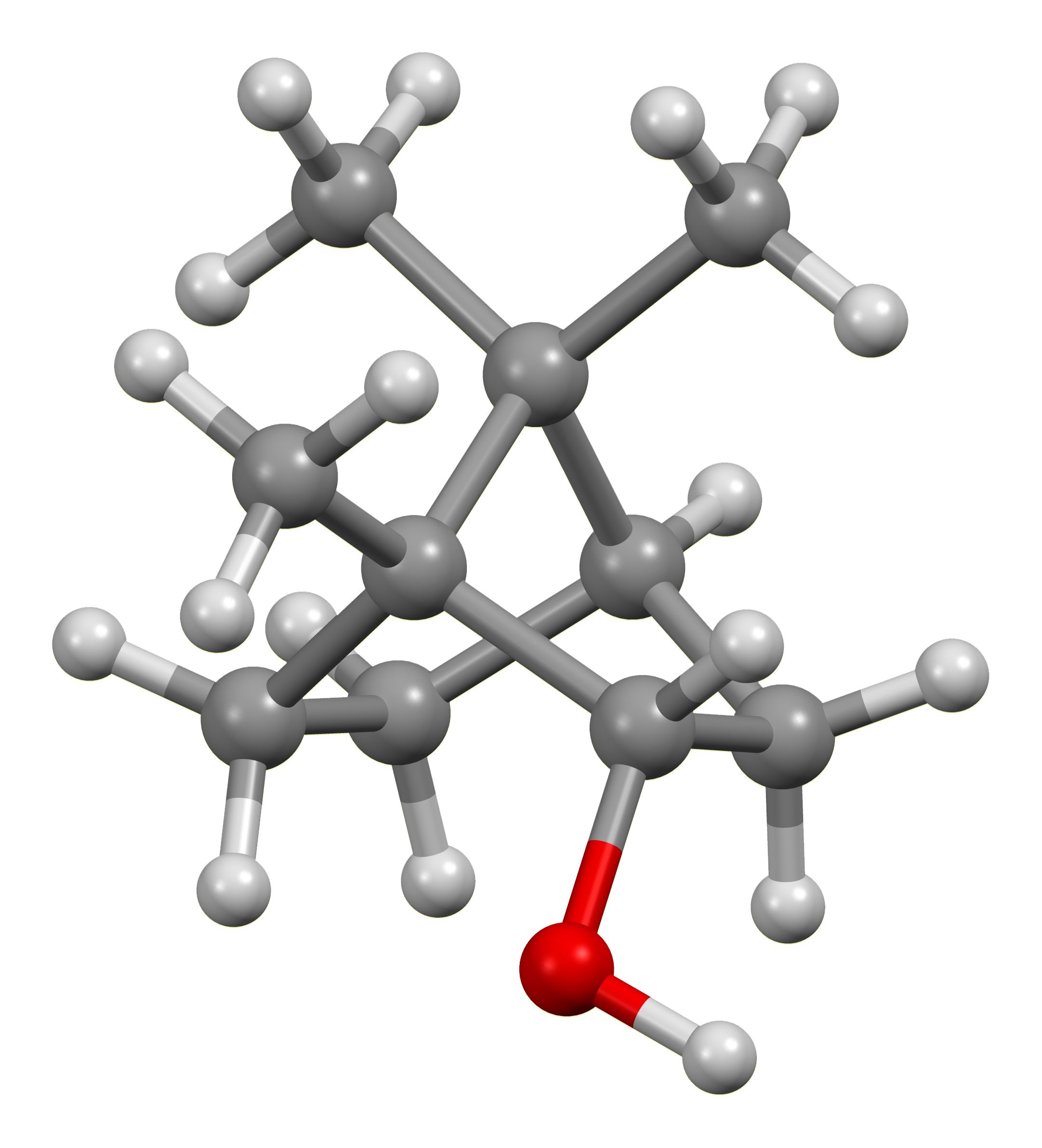
(+)-Borneol
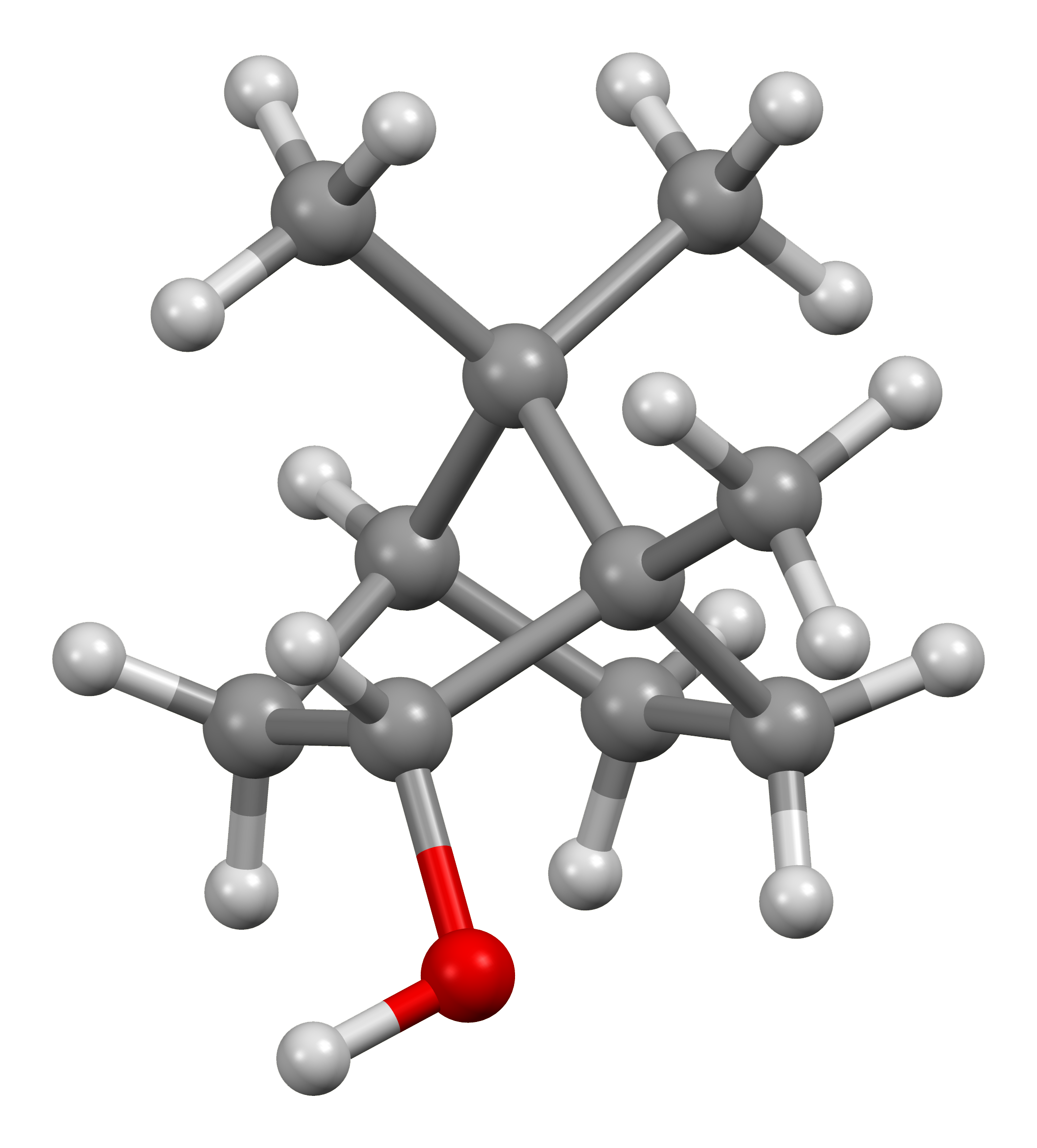
(-)-Borneol

Names
- IUPAC name rel-(1R,2S,4R)-1,7,7-Trimethylbicyclo[2.2.1]heptan-2-ol
- Other names 1,7,7-Trimethylbicyclo[2.2.1]heptan-2-endo-ol endo-2-Bornanol, Borneo camphor

Identifiers
CAS Number	507-70-0 (+/-)
3D model (JSmol)	Interactive image
ChEBI	CHEBI:15393
ChEMBL	ChEMBL486208
ChemSpider	5026296
ECHA InfoCard	100.007.346
EC Number	207-352-6
IUPHAR/BPS	6413
KEGG	C01411
PubChem CID	6552009
UNII	M89NIB437X
UN number	1312
- InChI: InChI=1S/C10H18O/c1-9(2)7-4-5-10(9,3)8(11)6-7/h7-8,11H,4-6H2,1-3H3/t7-,8+,10+/m1/s1 Key: DTGKSKDOIYIVQL-WEDXCCLWSA-N; (+/-): InChI=1/C10H18O/c1-9(2)7-4-5-10(9,3)8(11)6-7/h7-8,11H,4-6H2,1-3H3/t7-,8+,10+/s2 Key: DTGKSKDOIYIVQL-IUNFSSIHNA-N
- SMILES: O[C@H]1C[C@H]2CC[C@]1(C)C2(C)C

Properties
Chemical formula	C_{10}H_{18}O
Molar mass	154.253 g·mol^{−1}
Appearance	colorless to white lumps
Odor	pungent, camphor-like
Density	1.011 g/cm^{3} (20 °C)
Melting point	208 °C (406 °F; 481 K)
Boiling point	213 °C (415 °F; 486 K)
Solubility in water	slightly soluble (D-form)
Solubility	soluble in chloroform, ethanol, acetone, ether, benzene, toluene, decalin, tetralin
Magnetic susceptibility (χ)	−1.26×10^{−4} cm^{3}/mol

Hazards
- GHS labelling
Pictograms	(GHS02: Flammable)
Signal word	Warning
Hazard statements	H228
Precautionary statements	P210, P240, P241, P280, P370+P378
NFPA 704 (fire diamond)	2 2 0
Flash point	65 °C (149 °F; 338 K)
Safety data sheet (SDS)	External MSDS

Related compounds
Related compounds	Bornane (hydrocarbon)
- Except where otherwise noted, data are given for materials in their standard state (at 25 °C [77 °F], 100 kPa). verify (what is ?) Infobox references

Borneol is a bicyclic organic compound and a terpene derivative. The hydroxyl group in this compound is placed in an endo position. The exo diastereomer is called isoborneol. Being chiral, borneol exists as enantiomers, both of which are found in nature: d-borneol (also written (+)-borneol, dextroborneol, dexborneol) and l-borneol (or (−)-borneol, levoborneol).

Both borneol and isoborneol belong to the category of 2-bornanol, a derivative of bornane. Some sources such as PubChem and CHEBI use the term borneol to refer to the entire category of 2-bornanols while others such as KEGG use the term borneol to refer to the compounds with endo hydroxyl only.

== Reactions ==
Borneol is oxidized to the ketone camphor.

== Occurrence ==
The compound was identified and named camphre de Bornéo, or Borneo camphor in 1842 by the French chemist Charles Frédéric Gerhardt. Borneol can be found in several species of Heterotheca, Artemisia, Rosmarinus officinalis (rosemary), Dryobalanops aromatica, Blumea balsamifera and Kaempferia galanga.

It is one of the chemical compounds found in castoreum. This compound is gathered from the beaver's plant food.

=== Synthesis ===
Borneol can be synthesized by reduction of camphor by the Meerwein–Ponndorf–Verley reduction (a reversible process). For flavoring purposes, a racemic mixture of camphor is used as starting material, leading to a racemic mixture of borneol and isoborneol. The chirality can be controlled by changing the chirality of camphor: (+)-camphor gives (−)-isoborneol and (+)-borneol.

Reduction of camphor with sodium borohydride (fast and irreversible) gives instead the diastereomer isoborneol.

=== Natural sources ===
Borneol is a component of many essential oils.

Industrially, natural (+)-borneol is produced from Cinnamomum burmanni (one specific chemotype) and Cinnamomum camphora.

Natural (-)-borneol occurs in Blumea balsamifera.

=== Biosynthesis ===
Borneol is synthesized using DMAPP as the starting material. DMAPP is then converted to GPP, which is acted upon by a bornyl diphosphate synthase to yield a bornyl diphosphate. A phosphatase then removes the phosphate groups, yielding borneol.

The chirality of borneol in a plant depends on the preferred chirality of the bornyl diphosphate synthase. Synthases for either chirality have been sequenced.

A downstream product is camphor of either chirality, a reaction catalyzed by (+)-borneol dehydrogenase or (−)-borneol dehydrogenase.

== Uses ==
As mentioned above, both enantiomers of borneol occur in nature. Whereas d-borneol (+) was the enantiomer that used to be the most readily available commercially, the more commercially available enantiomer now is l-borneol (-).

Borneol generates a TRPM8-mediated cooling sensation similar to, but weaker than, menthol. It is more effective at activating TRPM8 at lower temperatures.

Borneol is also a natural insect repellent.

Laevo-borneol (-) is used in perfumery. It has a balsamic odour type with pine, woody and camphoraceous facets.

=== Medical uses ===
Dextro-borneol (dexborneol) is used in edaravone/dexborneol, a drug approved in China for stroke. It is approved in intravenous (2021) and sublingual (2025) forms. The intravenous combination was approved on the basis of trials showing it to be superior to edaravone alone.

=== Folk medicine ===
(+)-Borneol (d-) from Dipterocarpus spp. is used in traditional Chinese medicine (TCM). An early description is found in the Bencao Gangmu.

Volume 1 of the modern Chinese Pharmacopoeia, which deals with TCM and modernized TCM, lists uses for both enantiomers as well as the synthetic racemer.

Borneol is widely used in ophthalmic preparations in China, though little is known about its exact function.

== Toxicology ==
Borneol may cause eye, skin, and respiratory irritation; it is harmful if swallowed. Acute exposure may cause headache, nausea, vomiting, dizziness, lightheadedness, and syncope. Exposure to higher levels or over a longer period of time may cause restlessness, difficulty concentrating, irritability, and seizures.

=== Skin irritation ===
Borneol has been shown to have little to no irritation effect when applied to the human skin at doses used in fine fragrance formulation. Skin exposure can lead to sensitization and a future allergic reaction even to small quantities.

== Derivatives ==
The bornyl group is a univalent radical C_{10}H_{17} derived from borneol by removal of hydroxyl and is also known as 2-bornyl. Isobornyl is the univalent radical C_{10}H_{17} that is derived from isoborneol. Bornyl acetate is the acetate ester of borneol.

The norborneols are derived from borneol and isoborneol by the removal of methyl groups, analogous to the change from bornane to norbornane.

The epiborneols and isoepiborneols are analogously derived from epicamphor.

The structural isomer fenchol is a widely used compound derived from certain essential oils.
