= Geranyl acetate =

- Skeletal formula

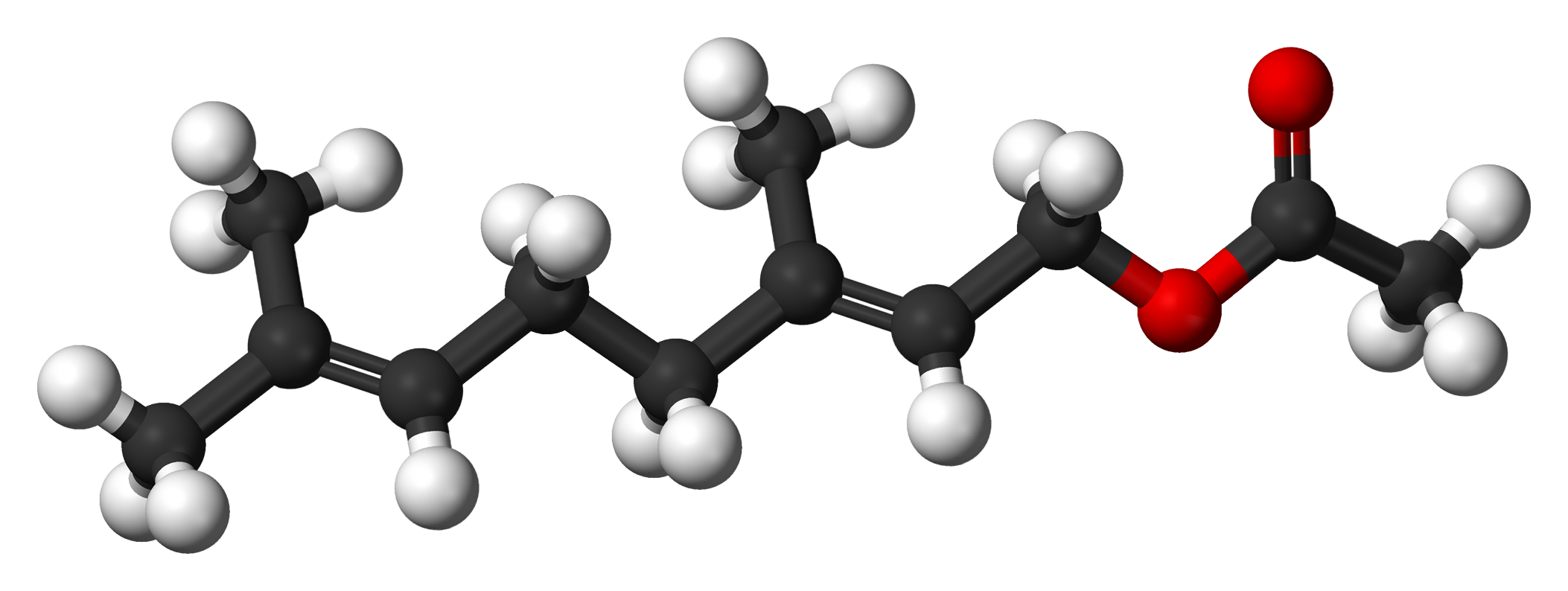
- Ball-and-stick model

Names
- Preferred IUPAC name (2E)-3,7-Dimethylocta-2,6-dien-1-yl acetate
- Other names Geraniol acetate; Geranyl ethanoate

Identifiers
CAS Number	105-87-3
3D model (JSmol)	Interactive image
ChEBI	CHEBI:5331
ChemSpider	1266019
ECHA InfoCard	100.003.038
PubChem CID	1549026
UNII	3W81YG7P9R
CompTox Dashboard (EPA)	DTXSID0020654
- InChI: InChI=1S/C12H20O2/c1-10(2)6-5-7-11(3)8-9-14-12(4)13/h6,8H,5,7,9H2,1-4H3/b11-8+ Key: HIGQPQRQIQDZMP-DHZHZOJOSA-N; InChI=1/C12H20O2/c1-10(2)6-5-7-11(3)8-9-14-12(4)13/h6,8H,5,7,9H2,1-4H3/b11-8+ Key: HIGQPQRQIQDZMP-DHZHZOJOBM
- SMILES: O=C(OC/C=C(/CC/C=C(\C)C)C)C

Properties
Chemical formula	C_{12}H_{20}O_{2}
Molar mass	196.290 g·mol^{−1}
Density	0.916 g/cm^{3} at 15 °C
Melting point	< 25 °C (77 °F; 298 K)
Boiling point	240 to 245 °C (464 to 473 °F; 513 to 518 K)
- Except where otherwise noted, data are given for materials in their standard state (at 25 °C [77 °F], 100 kPa). verify (what is ?) Infobox references

Geranyl acetate is a terpenoid. It is a colorless liquid with a pleasant floral or fruity rose aroma. It is a colorless liquid but commercial samples can appear yellowish. Geranyl acetate is insoluble in water but soluble in organic solvents. Several hundred tons are produced annually.

== Occurrence and production ==
Geranyl acetate is a constituent of many essential oils, including Ceylon citronella, palmarosa, lemon grass, petit grain, neroli, geranium, coriander, carrot, Camden woollybutt, and sassafras. It can be obtained by fractional distillation of the essential oils obtained from these sources, but more commonly it is prepared by the esterification of geraniol with acetic acid.

== Uses ==
Geranyl acetate is used primarily as a component of perfumes for creams and soaps and as a flavoring ingredient. It is used particularly in rose, lavender and geranium formulations where a sweet fruity or citrus aroma is desired. Its aroma is described as floral, rose, lavender, green, waxy, and herbal. It is designated by the U.S. Food and Drug Administration as generally recognized as safe (GRAS).

== See also ==
- Neryl acetate
