= Neryl acetate =

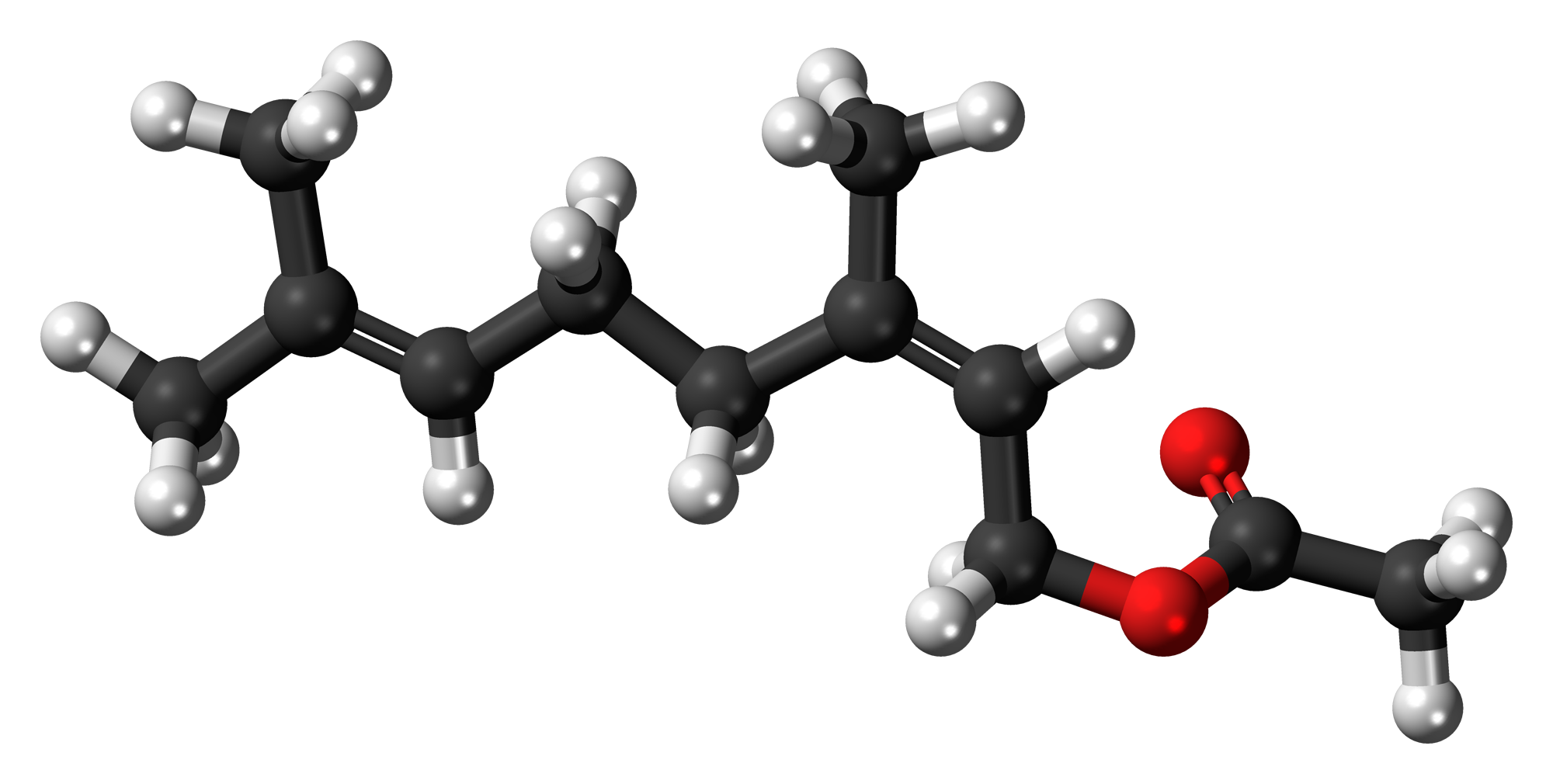

Names
- Preferred IUPAC name (2Z)-3,7-Dimethylocta-2,6-dien-1-yl acetate
- Other names Nerol acetate; Acetic acid neryl ester; cis-Geranyl acetate

Identifiers
| CAS Number | 141-12-8 |
| 3D model (JSmol) | Interactive image |
| ChEBI | CHEBI:141210 |
| ChemSpider | 1266018 |
| ECHA InfoCard | 100.004.964 |
| PubChem CID | 1549025 |
| UNII | OF82IJU18H |
| CompTox Dashboard (EPA) | DTXSID2047068 |
- InChI: InChI=1S/C12H20O2/c1-10(2)6-5-7-11(3)8-9-14-12(4)13/h6,8H,5,7,9H2,1-4H3/b11-8- Key: HIGQPQRQIQDZMP-FLIBITNWSA-N; InChI=1/C12H20O2/c1-10(2)6-5-7-11(3)8-9-14-12(4)13/h6,8H,5,7,9H2,1-4H3/b11-8- Key: HIGQPQRQIQDZMP-FLIBITNWBJ
- SMILES: O=C(OC\C=C(/CC/C=C(\C)C)C)C

Properties
| Chemical formula | C_{12}H_{20}O_{2} |
| Molar mass | 196.290 g·mol^{−1} |
| Appearance | colorless liquid |
| Density | 0.91 g/cm^{3} |
| Boiling point | 231 °C (448 °F; 504 K) |

Hazards
| Flash point | 99 °C (210 °F) |
- Except where otherwise noted, data are given for materials in their standard state (at 25 °C [77 °F], 100 kPa). Infobox references

Neryl acetate is a terpenoid found in citrus oils. It is the acetate ester of nerol, a diastereomer (or geometric isomer) of the more common fragrance geranyl acetate. Its aroma is described as floral, rose, soapy, citrus, dewy, pear, sweet, grapefruit, fruity, and tropical. In flavors and perfumery it is used to impart floral and fruity aromas.

== See also ==
- Geranyl acetate
