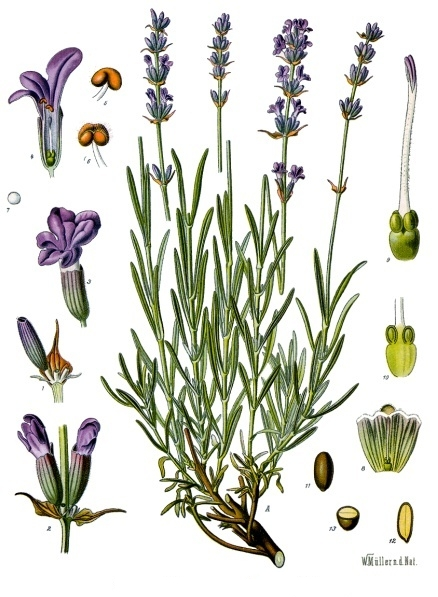
- Common lavender (Lavandula angustifolia)

Conservation status
- Least Concern (IUCN 3.1)

Scientific classification
- Kingdom: Plantae
- Clade: Tracheophytes
- Clade: Angiosperms
- Clade: Eudicots
- Clade: Asterids
- Order: Lamiales
- Family: Lamiaceae
- Genus: Lavandula
- Species: L. angustifolia

Binomial name
- Lavandula angustifolia Mill.

Synonyms
- Lavandula officinalis Chaix ex Vill.; Lavandula pyrenaica DC.; Lavandula vera DC.

= Lavandula angustifolia =

Species of plant

Lavandula angustifolia, formerly L. officinalis, is a flowering plant in the family Lamiaceae, native to the Mediterranean basin. Its common names include lavender, true lavender and English lavender (though it is not native to England); also garden lavender, common lavender and narrow-leaved lavender."Lavandula angustifolia Mill". Plants of the World Online. Royal Botanic Gardens, Kew.

== Description ==
It is a strongly aromatic shrub growing as high as 1 to 2 metres (3 1/2 to 6 1/2 ft) tall. The leaves are evergreen, 2–6 centimetres (1–2 1/2 inches) long, and 4–6 millimetres (3/16–1/4 in) broad. The flowers are typically purple (lavender-coloured), produced on spikes 2–8 cm (1–3 in) long at the top of slender, leafless stems 10–30 cm (4–12 in) long.

- "English lavender". Kew. Royal Botanic Gardens, Kew.
- "English lavender". Royal Horticultural Society.
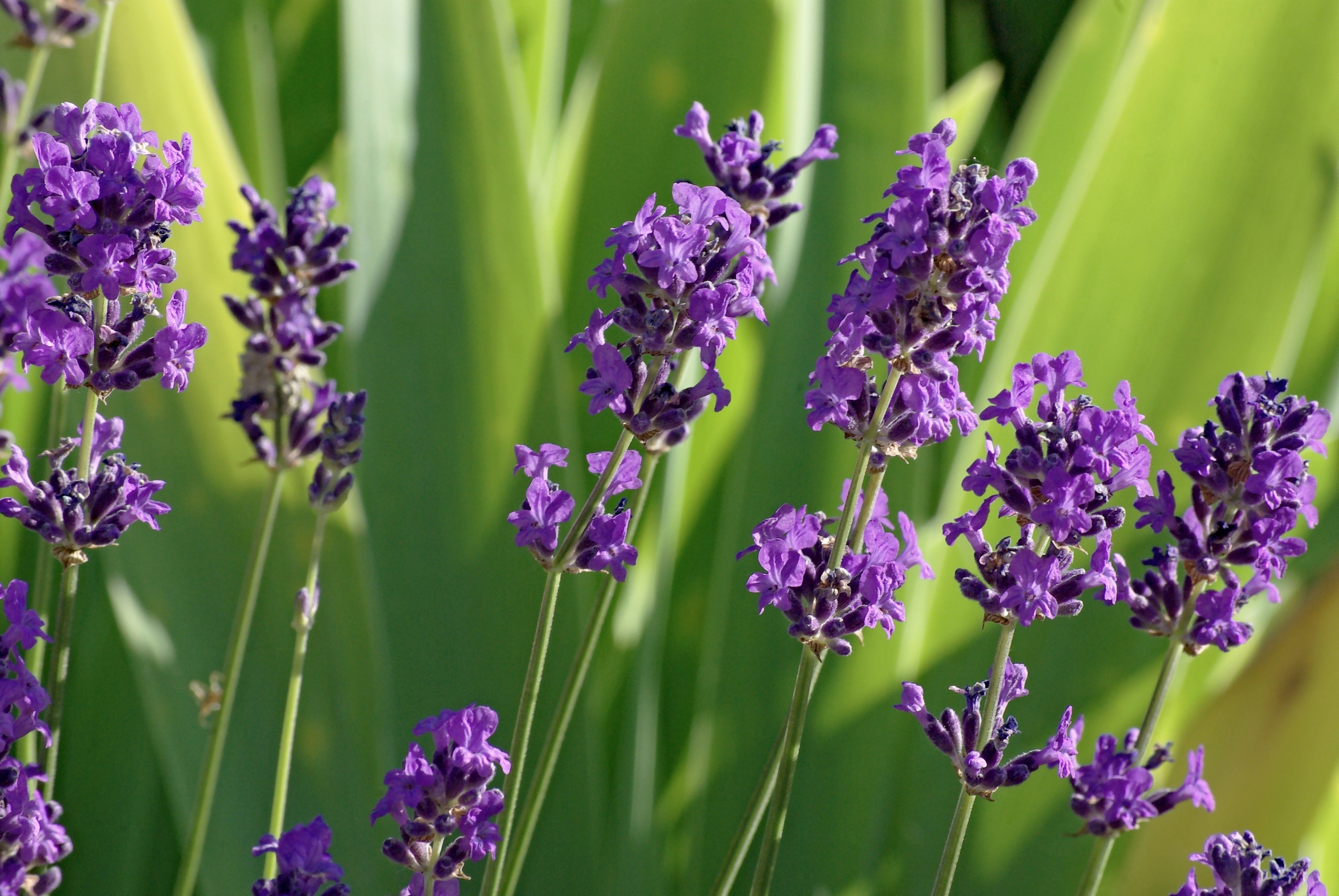
Stems and flowers

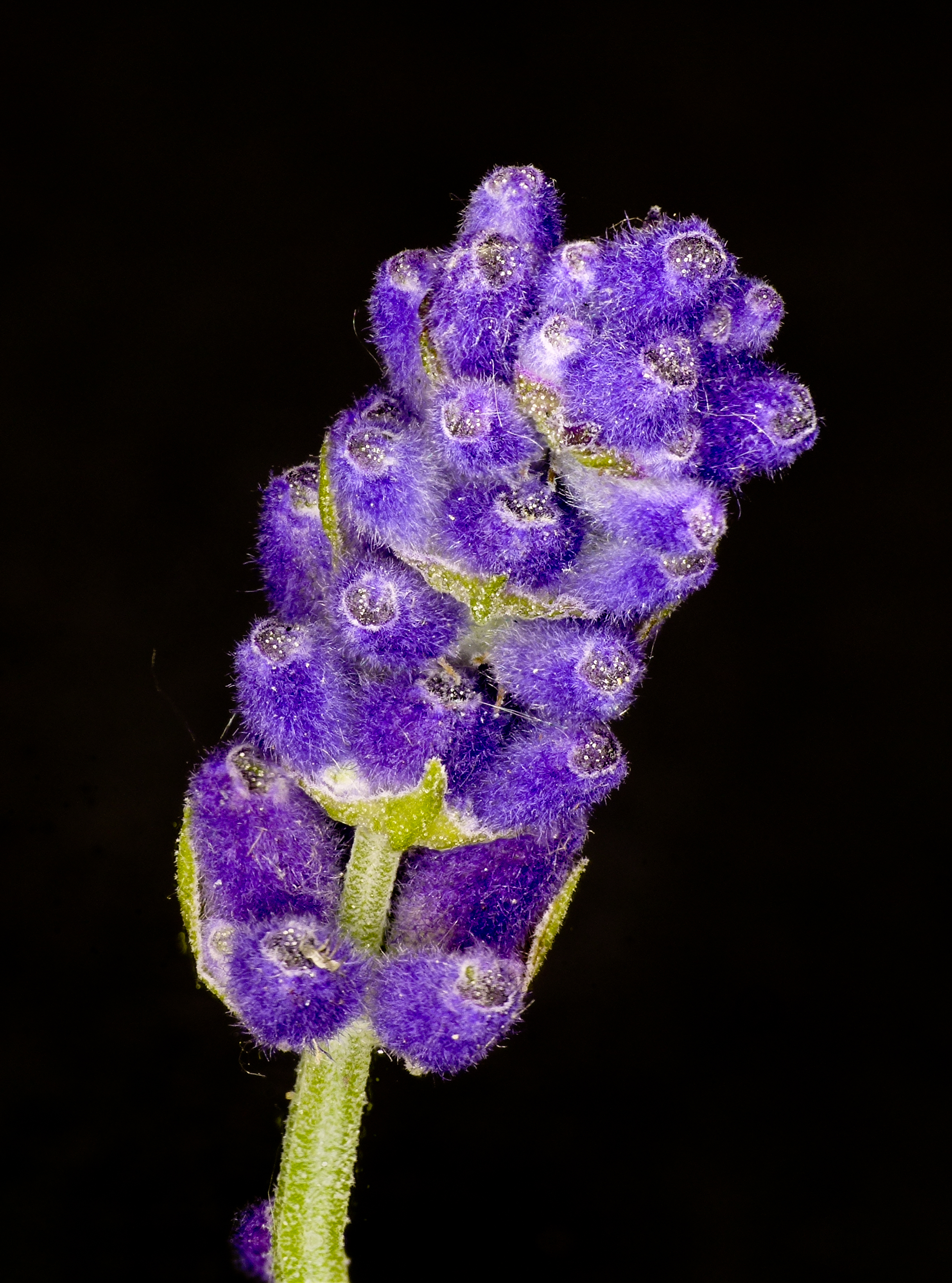
Flower spike before the petals emerge

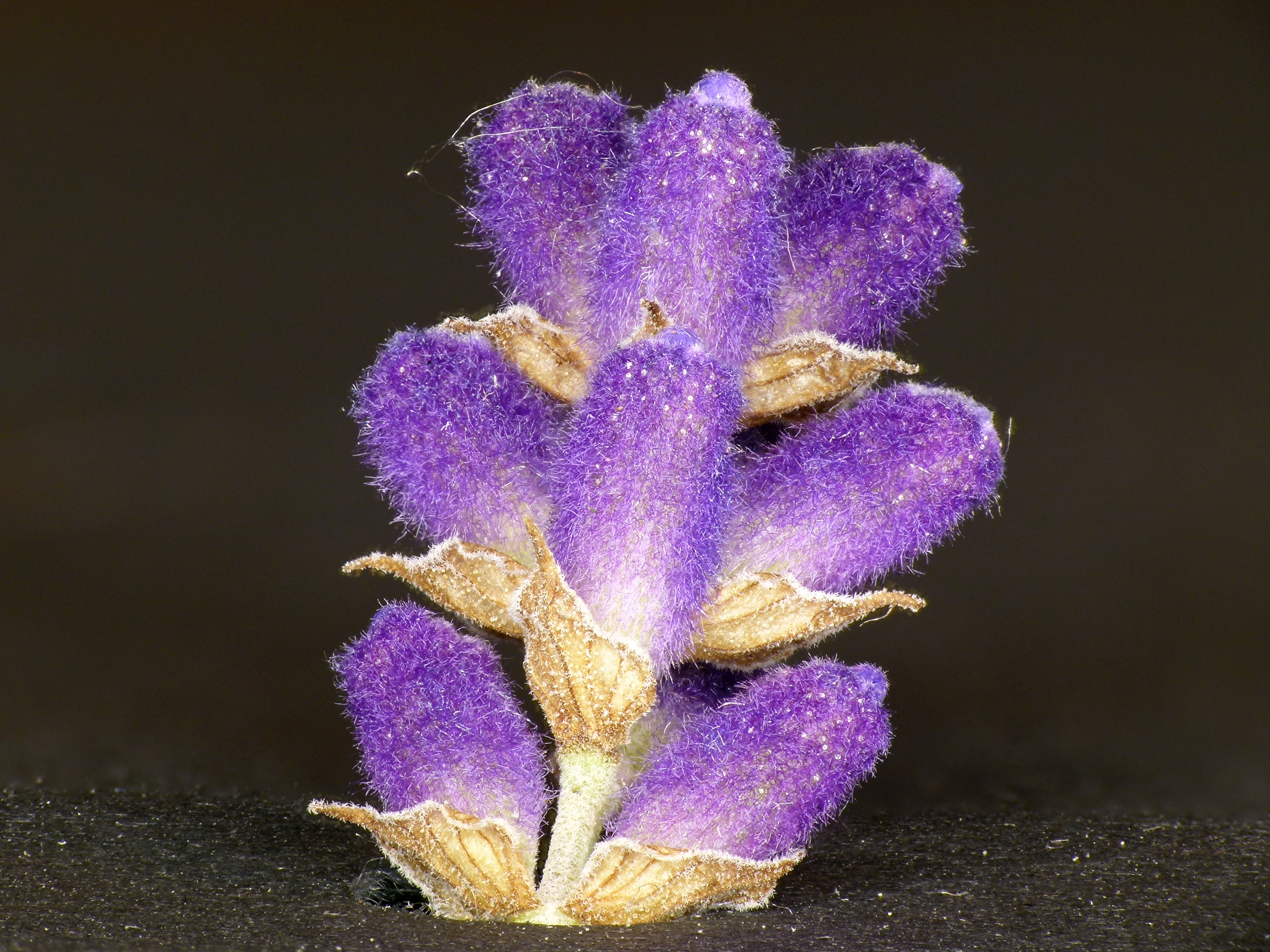
Calyx (purple) and flower bracts (light brown)

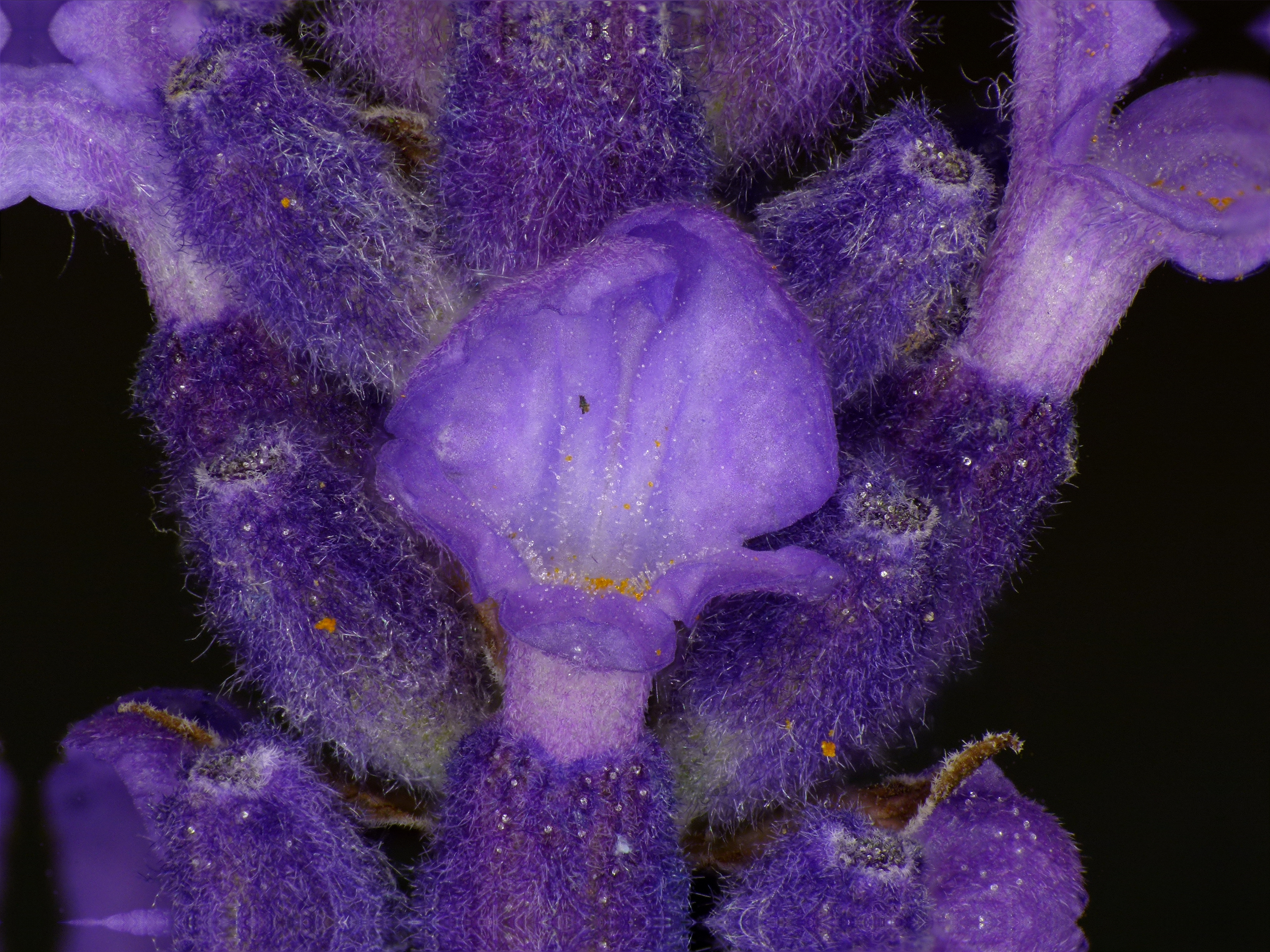
Calyx and corolla

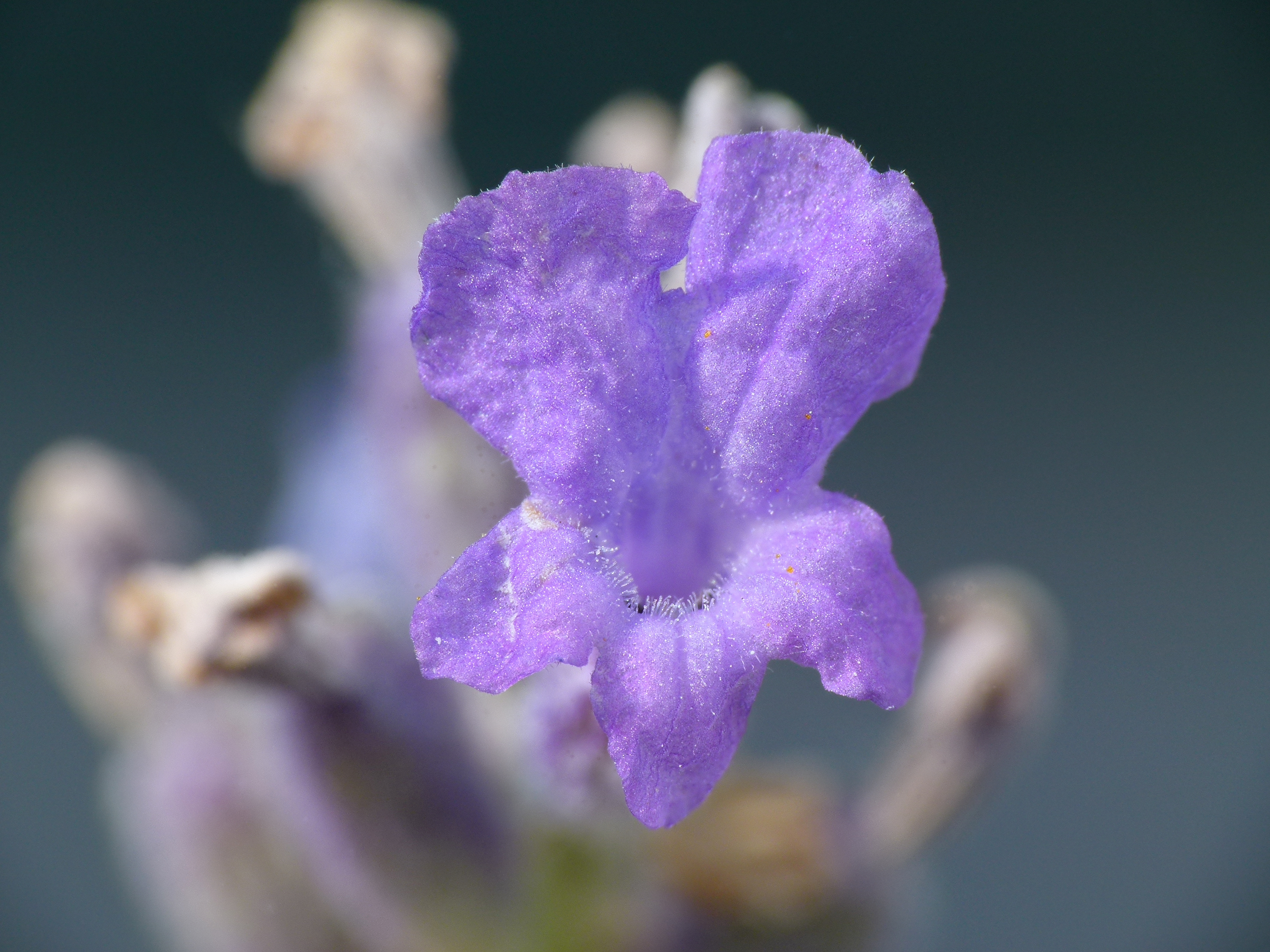
Corolla (petals)

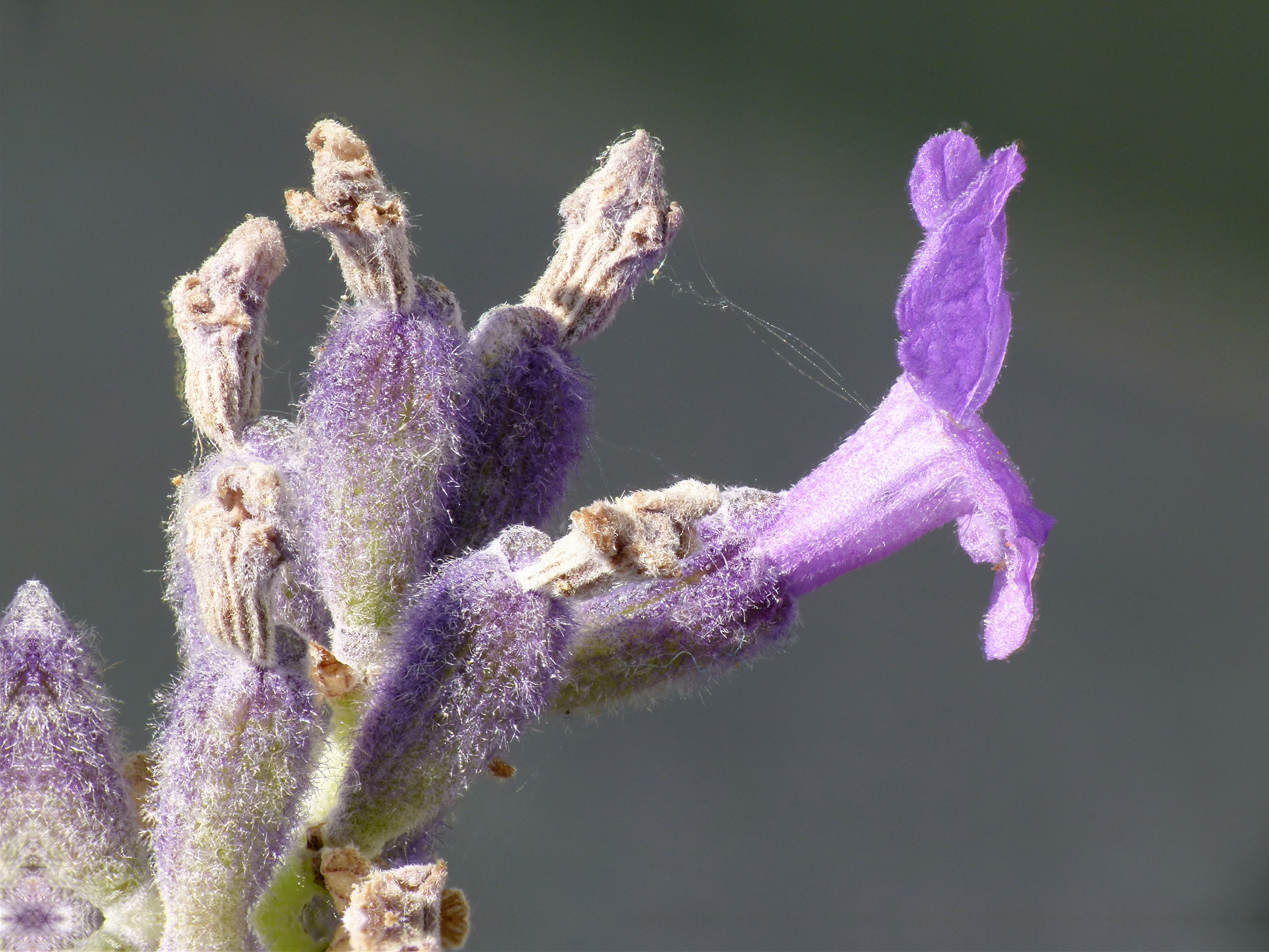
Calyx and corolla (side view)

== Etymology ==
The species name angustifolia is Latin for "narrow leaf". Previously, it was known as Lavandula officinalis, referring to its medicinal properties.

== Cultivation ==
English lavender is commonly grown as an ornamental plant. It is popular for its colourful flowers, its fragrance, and its ability to survive with low water consumption. It does not grow well in continuously damp soil and may benefit from increased drainage. It does best in Mediterranean climates similar to its native habitat, characterised by wet winters and dry summers. It is fairly tolerant of low temperatures, and is generally considered hardy to Royal Horticultural Society zone H6, or USDA zone 5. It tolerates acid soils, but favours neutral to alkaline soils, and in some conditions it may be short-lived.

== Cultivars ==
=== AGM cultivars ===
The following cultivars of L. angustifolia and its hybrids have gained the Royal Horticultural Society's Award of Garden Merit:-

- L. × intermedia 'Alba' (large white)
- L. angustifolia 'Beechwood Blue'
- L. angustifolia 'Hidcote'
- L. × intermedia 'Hidcote Giant'
- L. angustifolia 'Imperial Gem'
- L. angustifolia 'Little Lottie'
- L. angustifolia 'Miss Katherine'
- L. angustifolia 'Miss Muffet'
- L. angustifolia 'Nana Alba' (dwarf white)
- L. × intermedia 'Olympia'
- L × chaytoriae 'Richard Gray'
- L. × chaytoriae 'Sawyers'
- L. × intermedia 'Sussex'

=== Dwarf cultivars ===
Compacta, Folgate, Dwarf Blue, Dwarf White, Hidcote Pink, Hidcote Superior, Munstead, Nana Atropurpurea, Nana Rosea, Sarah, Summerland Supreme, Lady Lavender

- 'Hidcote Superior', a compact evergreen shrub 40 cm × 45 cm (16 in × 18 in) with fragrant gray-green foliage and deep violet-blue flowers in summer, prefers full sun, well drained soil, low water, hardy to −30 °C (−22 °F), western Mediterranean species
- 'Munstead' (syn. Dwarf Munstead, Munstead Blue and Munstead Variety) L. angustifolia variety, 30 cm (12 in) tall, having pink-purple to lavender-blue inflorescences that are slightly fragrant, named after Munstead Wood in Surrey, which was the home of Gertrude Jekyll
- 'Sarah', grows to 15–60 cm (5.9–23.6 in), the flowers are petite, as is the plant, used as a short edging, or as a very fragrant addition to the window box, dark violet flowers
- 'Lady Lavender', grows to 45 cm (18 in), fragrant, gray-green foliage and lavender-blue flowers in summer, prefers full sun, well-drained soil, low water, hardy to −30 °C (−22 °F)

=== Semi-dwarf cultivars ===
Bowles Early, Hidcote Variety, Loddon Blue, Martha Roderick, Jean Davis, Twickle Purple, Pink Perfume

- 'Hidcote' (syn. Hidcote Variety, Hidcote Blue, Hidcote Purple) L. angustifolia variety. 40 to 50 cm (16 to 20 in) tall, with silver-gray foliage and deep violet-blue inflorescences, named after Hidcote Manor in England as it was cultivated there by Lawrence Johnston
- 'Jean Davis' 50–60 cm (20–24 in) tall, up to 1 m (3.3 ft). A pale pink flowered lavender with exceptionally fruity taste
- 'Pink Perfume' 60 cm × 45 cm (24 in × 18 in)

=== Giant cultivars ===
Alba, Backhouse Purple, Biostos, Bridestowe, Graves, Gray Lady, Gwendolyn Anley, Hidcote Giant, Irene Doyle, Mailette, Middachten

- 'Hidcote Giant'. A Lavandula × intermedia lavandin. Very vigorous grower (90 to 100 cm; 35 to 39 in) with a lovely strong fragrance. This has large deep lavender-purple flowers on very long 60 cm (24 in) stems.
- 'Vera' 75 to 90 cm (30 to 35 in). Thought to be the original species lavender, harvested for its oil.

== Uses ==
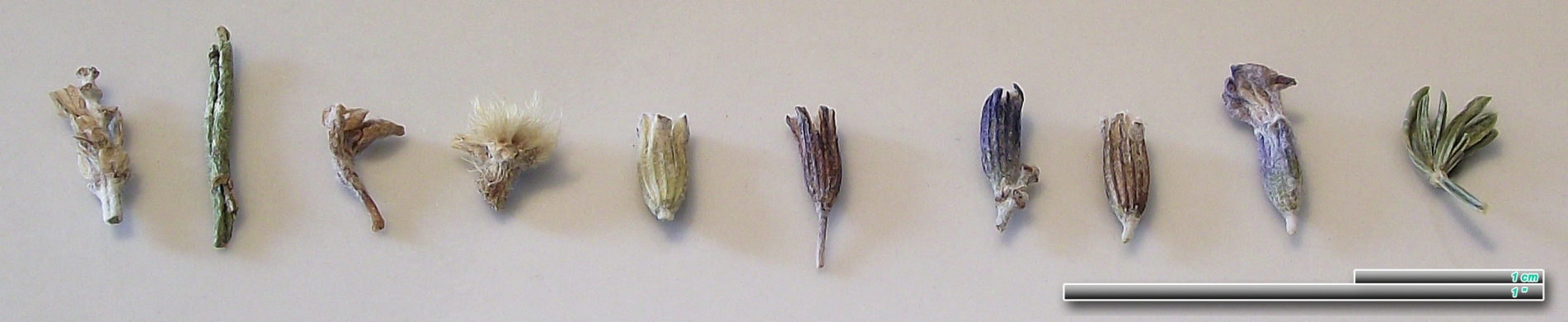
Dried Lavandulae flos as used in herbal teas

The flowers and leaves are applied in herbal medicine. Commercially, the plant is used to produce lavender essential oil used in balms, salves, perfumes, cosmetics, and topical applications. Lavender essential oil, when diluted with a carrier oil, is commonly used for massage therapy or aromatherapy.

The flowers are also used as a culinary herb, most often as part of the North American version of the French herb blend called herbes de Provence.

Lavandula angustifolia is included in the Tasmanian Fire Service's list of low flammability plants, indicating that it is suitable for growing within a building protection zone.

=== Subspecies ===
- Lavandula angustifolia subsp. angustifolia
- Lavandula angustifolia subsp. pyrenaica

=== Hybrids ===
Lavandula hybrids are referred to as lavandins. Hybrids between L. angustifolia and L. latifolia (spike lavender) are called Lavandula × intermedia. They bloom later than the ordinary English lavenders.

== See also ==
- Lavandula
- Xeriscaping
