= Camphene =

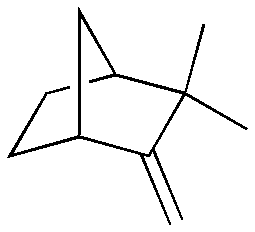

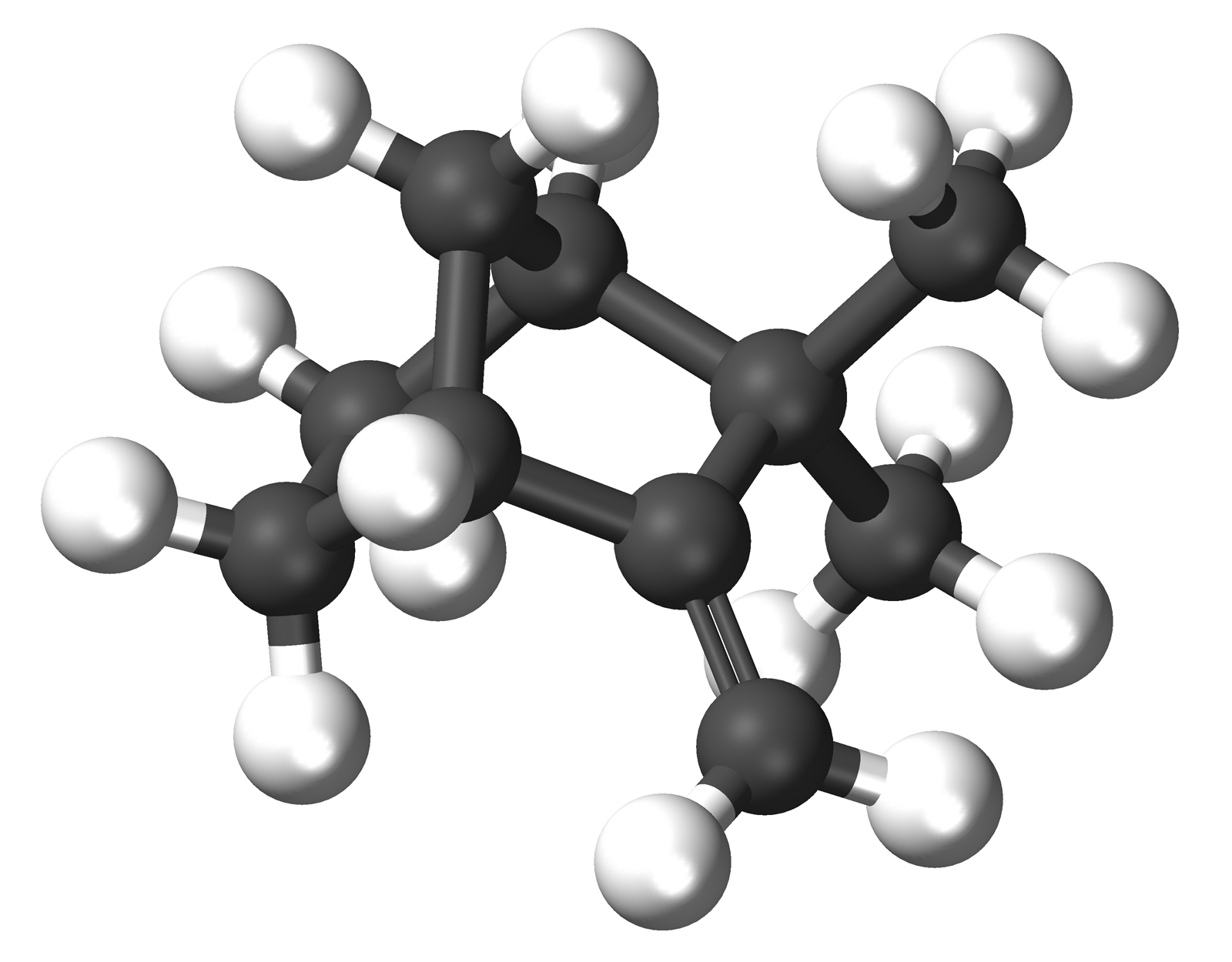

Names
- Preferred IUPAC name 2,2-Dimethyl-3-methylidenebicyclo[2.2.1]heptane
- Other names 2,2-Dimethyl-3-methanylidenebicyclo[2.2.1]heptane; 2,2-Dimethyl-3-methylenebicyclo[2.2.1]heptane

Identifiers
CAS Number	79-92-5 racemate; 5794-03-6]] + enantiomer; 5794-04-7 - enantiomer
3D model (JSmol)	Interactive image
ChEBI	CHEBI:3830
ChEMBL	ChEMBL2268550
ChemSpider	6364
ECHA InfoCard	100.001.123
EC Number	201-234-8
KEGG	C06076
PubChem CID	6616
RTECS number	EX1055000
UNII	G3VG94Z26E
UN number	2319 1325
CompTox Dashboard (EPA)	DTXSID8026488
- InChI: InChI=1S/C10H16/c1-7-8-4-5-9(6-8)10(7,2)3/h8-9H,1,4-6H2,2-3H3 Key: CRPUJAZIXJMDBK-UHFFFAOYSA-N; InChI=1/C10H16/c1-7-8-4-5-9(6-8)10(7,2)3/h8-9H,1,4-6H2,2-3H3 Key: CRPUJAZIXJMDBK-UHFFFAOYAL
- SMILES: C1(=C)C(C)(C)C2CC1CC2

Properties
Chemical formula	C_{10}H_{16}
Molar mass	136.238 g·mol^{−1}
Appearance	White or colorless solid
Density	0.842 g/cm^{3}
Melting point	51 to 52 °C (124 to 126 °F; 324 to 325 K)
Boiling point	159 °C (318 °F; 432 K)
Solubility in water	Practically insoluble

Hazards
- GHS labelling
Pictograms	(GHS02: Flammable) (GHS07: Exclamation mark) (GHS09: Environmental hazard)
Signal word	Warning
Hazard statements	H226, H228, H319, H410
Precautionary statements	P210, P233, P240, P241, P242, P243, P264, P273, P280, P303+P361+P353, P305+P351+P338, P337+P313, P370+P378, P391, P403+P235, P501
Flash point	40 °C (104 °F; 313 K)
- Except where otherwise noted, data are given for materials in their standard state (at 25 °C [77 °F], 100 kPa). verify (what is ?) Infobox references

Camphene is a bicyclic organic compound. It is one of the most pervasive monoterpenes. As with other terpenes, it is insoluble in water, flammable, colorless, and has a pungent smell. It is a minor constituent of many essential oils such as turpentine, cypress oil, camphor oil, citronella oil, neroli, ginger oil, valerian, and mango. It is produced industrially by isomerization of the more common alpha-pinene using a solid acid catalyst such as titanium dioxide.

Camphene is used in the preparation of fragrances and as a food additive for flavoring. These include isobornyl acetate. The aroma of the racemate is described as woody, herbal, fir needle, camphoreous, terpenic, cooling, pine, citrus, green, minty, and spicy. The aroma of dextro enantiomer is described as fresh, herbal, woody, fir needle, and camphoreous, whereas that of the laevo enantiomer is fresh, woody, fir needle, and terpenic.

== Biosynthesis ==
Camphene is biosynthesized from linalyl pyrophosphate via a sequence of carbocationic intermediates.

Biosynthesis of camphene (one enantiomer) from linalyl pyrophosphate.
