= Camphor =

Toxic, waxy organic compound

- Structural formula of (R) and (S)-camphor (+)- and (−)-camphor

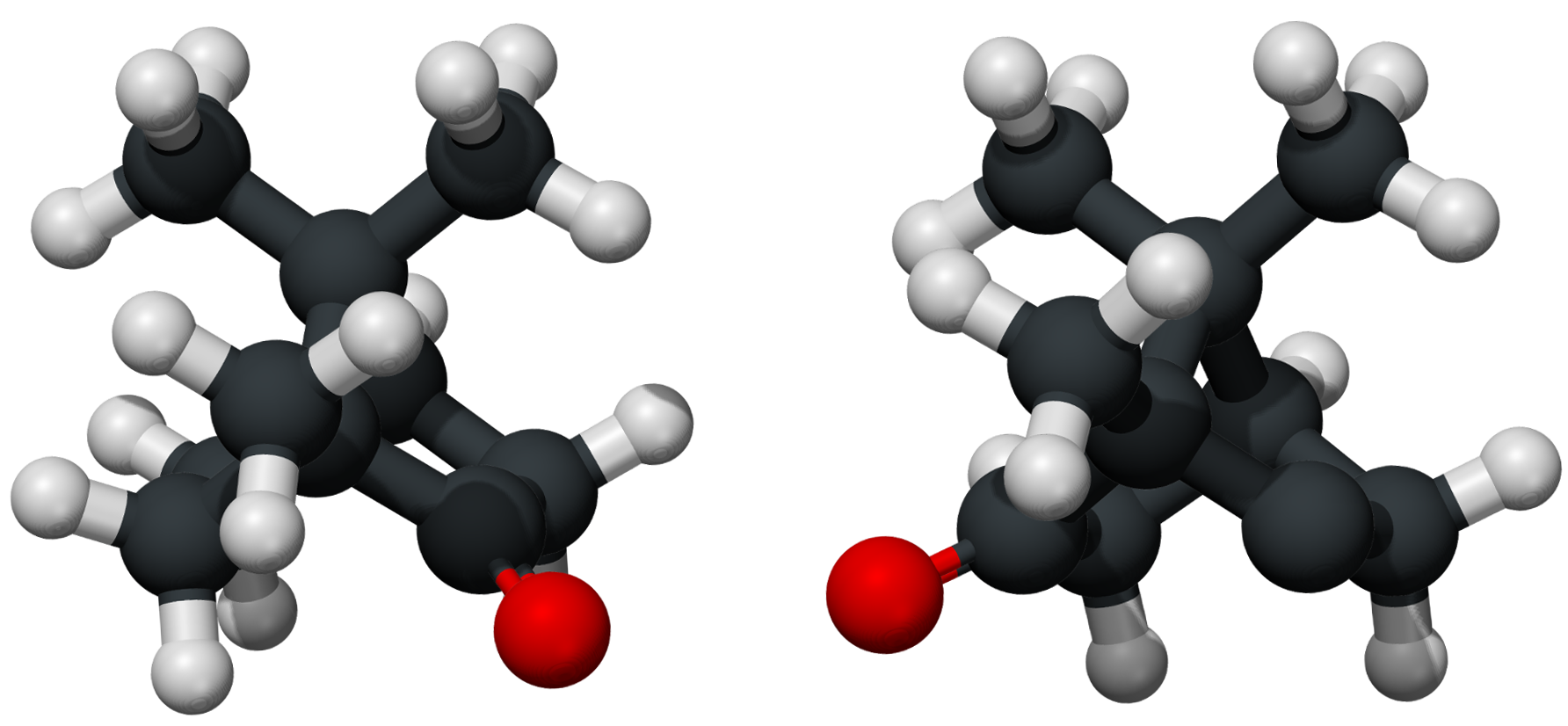
- Ball and stick model of camphor (both enantiomers).

Names
- IUPAC name 1,7,7-Trimethylbicyclo[2.2.1]heptan-2-one
- Other names 2-Bornanone; Bornan-2-one; 2-Camphanone; Formosa

Identifiers
CAS Number	76-22-2; 464-49-3 (R); 464-48-2 (S)
3D model (JSmol)	Interactive image; Interactive image
Beilstein Reference	1907611
ChEBI	CHEBI:36773
ChEMBL	ChEMBL504760
ChemSpider	2441; 7822160 (R); 9655 (S)
DrugBank	DB01744
ECHA InfoCard	100.000.860
EC Number	200-945-0
Gmelin Reference	83275
IUPHAR/BPS	2422
KEGG	D00098
MeSH	Camphor
PubChem CID	2537; 9543187 (R); 10050 (S)
RTECS number	EX1225000
UNII	5TJD82A1ET; N20HL7Q941 (R); 213N3S8275 (S)
UN number	2717
CompTox Dashboard (EPA)	DTXSID5030955
- InChI: InChI=1S/C10H16O/c1-9(2)7-4-5-10(9,3)8(11)6-7/h7H,4-6H2,1-3H3 Key: DSSYKIVIOFKYAU-UHFFFAOYSA-N; InChI=1/C10H16O/c1-9(2)7-4-5-10(9,3)8(11)6-7/h7H,4-6H2,1-3H3 Key: DSSYKIVIOFKYAU-UHFFFAOYAK
- SMILES: CC1(C)C2CCC1(C)C(=O)C2; O=C1CC2CCC1(C)C2(C)C

Properties
Chemical formula	C_{10}H_{16}O
Molar mass	152.237 g·mol^{−1}
Appearance	White, translucent crystals
Odor	Fragrant and penetrating
Density	0.992 g·cm^{−3}
Melting point	175–177 °C (347–351 °F; 448–450 K)
Boiling point	209 °C (408 °F; 482 K)
Solubility in water	1.2 g·dm^{−3}
Solubility in acetone	~2500 g·dm^{−3}
Solubility in acetic acid	~2000 g·dm^{−3}
Solubility in diethyl ether	~2000 g·dm^{−3}
Solubility in chloroform	~1000 g·dm^{−3}
Solubility in ethanol	~1000 g·dm^{−3}
log P	2.089
Vapor pressure	4 mmHg (at 70 °C)
Chiral rotation ([α]_{D})	+44.1°
Magnetic susceptibility (χ)	−103×10^{−6} cm^{3}/mol

Pharmacology
ATC code	C01EB02 (WHO)

Hazards
- GHS labelling
Pictograms	(GHS02: Flammable) (GHS07: Exclamation mark) (GHS08: Health hazard)
Signal word	Warning
Hazard statements	H228, H302, H332, H371
Precautionary statements	P210, P240, P241, P260, P264, P270, P271, P280, P301+P312, P304+P312, P304+P340, P309+P311, P312, P330, P370+P378, P405, P501
NFPA 704 (fire diamond)	2 2 0
Flash point	54 °C (129 °F; 327 K)
Autoignition temperature	466 °C (871 °F; 739 K)
Explosive limits	0.6–3.5%
- Lethal dose or concentration (LD, LC)
LD_{50} (median dose)	1310 mg/kg (oral, mouse)
LD_{Lo} (lowest published)	800 mg/kg (dog, oral); 2000 mg/kg (rabbit, oral)
LC_{Lo} (lowest published)	400 mg/m^{3} (mouse, 3 hr)
- NIOSH (US health exposure limits)
PEL (Permissible)	TWA 2 mg/m^{3}
REL (Recommended)	TWA 2 mg/m^{3}
IDLH (Immediate danger)	200 mg/m^{3}

Related compounds
Related ketones	Fenchone, thujone, Verbenone
Related compounds	Camphene, pinene, borneol, isoborneol, camphorsulfonic acid
- Except where otherwise noted, data are given for materials in their standard state (at 25 °C [77 °F], 100 kPa). verify (what is ?) Infobox references

Camphor (/ˈkæmfər/) is a waxy, colorless solid with a strong aroma derived from the wood of the camphor laurel (Cinnamomum camphora), a large evergreen tree found in East Asia; and in the kapur tree (Dryobalanops sp.), a tall timber tree from South East Asia. It is classified as a terpenoid and a cyclic ketone. It also occurs in some other related trees in the laurel family, notably Ocotea usambarensis. Rosemary leaves (Rosmarinus officinalis) contain 0.05 to 0.5% camphor, while camphorweed (Heterotheca) contains some 5%. A major source of camphor in Asia is camphor basil (the parent of African blue basil). Camphor can also be synthetically produced from oil of turpentine.

The compound is chiral, existing in two possible enantiomers as shown in the structural diagrams. The structure on the left is the typical naturally occurring (+)-camphor ((1R,4R)-bornan-2-one), while its mirror image shown on the right is the (−)-camphor ((1S,4S)-bornan-2-one), which is very rare in nature. Camphor is of historic significance as a compound that is readily purified from natural sources.

== Etymology ==
The word camphor derived in the 14th century from Old French: camphre, itself from Medieval Latin: camfora, from Arabic: كافور, romanized: kāfūr, perhaps through Sanskrit: कर्पूर, romanized: karpūra, from Tamil: கற்பூரம், romanized: karpooram apparently from Austronesian Malay: kapur 'lime' (chalk).

In Old Malay, camphor was called kapur barus, meaning "the chalk of Barus", referring to Barus, an ancient port near modern Sibolga on the western coast of Sumatra. This port traded in camphor extracted from the Borneo camphor trees (Dryobalanops aromatica) that were abundant in the region.

== Production ==
=== Natural camphor ===
Natural (+)-camphor has been produced as a forest product for centuries, condensed from the vapor given off by the roasting of woodchips cut from Camphora officinarum, and later by passing steam through the pulverized wood and condensing the vapors.

By the early 19th century, most camphor tree reserves had been depleted with the remaining large stands in Japan and Taiwan, with Taiwanese production greatly exceeding Japanese. Camphor was one of the primary resources extracted by Taiwan's colonial powers as well as one of the most lucrative. First the Chinese and then the Japanese established monopolies on Taiwanese camphor. In 1868, a British naval force sailed into Anping harbor and the local British representative demanded the end of the Chinese camphor monopoly. After the local imperial representative refused, the British bombarded the town and took the harbor. The "camphor regulations" negotiated between the two sides subsequently saw a brief end to the camphor monopoly.

(-)-camphor is much rarer, but it does occur naturally in the essential oil of Matricaria plants.

=== Synthetic camphor ===
Camphor is produced from alpha-pinene, which is abundant in the oils of coniferous trees and can be distilled from turpentine produced as a side product of chemical pulping. With acetic anhydride as the solvent and with catalysis by a strong acid, alpha-pinene is converted to isobornyl acetate. Hydrolysis of this ester gives isoborneol which can be oxidized to give racemic camphor.

A biological enzyme has been proposed for producing only the rare (-) or L-camphor. This EstB esterase from Burkholderia gladioli hydrolyzes only (+)-isobornyl acetate.

== Reactions ==
The reactions of camphor have been extensively examined. Some representative transformations include

- sulfonation:

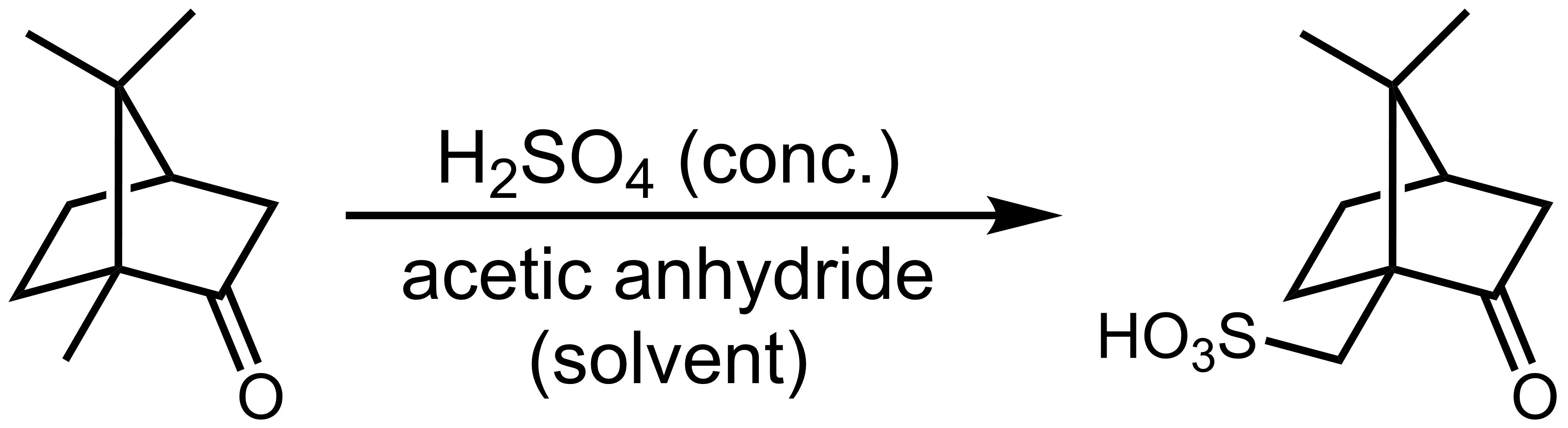

- oxidation with selenium dioxide to camphorquinone .

Camphor can also be reduced to isoborneol using sodium borohydride. It can be converted to the alkene bornylene.

Camphor forms an enolate when treated with sodium hydride. The enolate condenses with esters to give 1,3-diketones.

== Biochemistry ==
Biosynthesis of camphor from geranyl pyrophosphate

=== Biosynthesis ===
In biosynthesis, camphor is produced from geranyl pyrophosphate, via cyclisation of linaloyl pyrophosphate to bornyl pyrophosphate, followed by hydrolysis to borneol and oxidation to camphor.

== Uses ==
The first significant manmade plastics were low-nitrogen (or "soluble") nitrocellulose (pyroxylin) plastics. In the early decades of the plastics industry, camphor was used in immense quantities as the plasticizer that creates celluloid from nitrocellulose, in nitrocellulose lacquers and other plastics and lacquers.

=== Alternative medicine and scent ===
Camphor has been used for its scent, as an embalming fluid, as topical medication, as a manufacturing chemical, and in religious ceremonies.

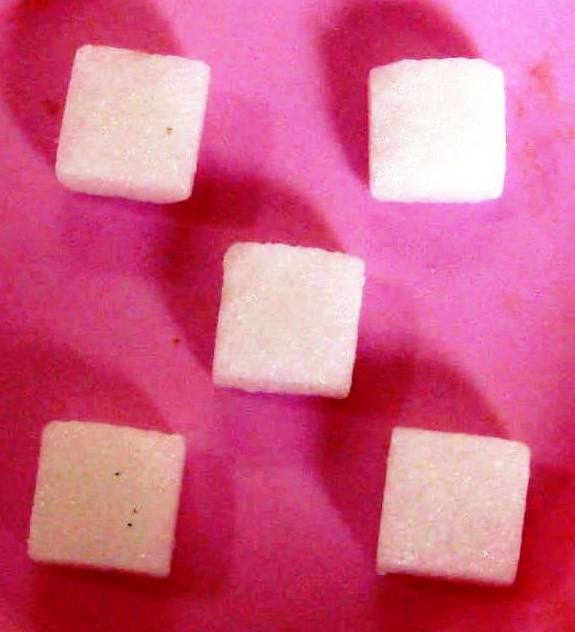
Camphor cubes

Camphor has been used as a folk medicine over centuries, probably most commonly as a decongestant. Camphor was used in ancient Sumatra to treat sprains, swellings, and inflammation. Camphor also was used for centuries in traditional Chinese medicine for various purposes. In Europe, camphor was used after the Black Death era.

In the 20th century, camphor was used as an analeptic by injection, and to induce seizures in schizophrenic people in an attempt to treat psychosis.

The 9th President of the United States, William Henry Harrison, was administered camphor by his physician Thomas Miller in the final days of his life.

Camphor has limited use in veterinary medicine by intramuscular injection to treat breathing difficulties in horses.

=== Topical medication ===
Camphor is commonly applied as a topical medication as a skin cream or ointment to relieve itching from insect bites, minor skin irritation, or joint pain. It is absorbed in the skin epidermis, where it stimulates nerve endings sensitive to heat and cold, producing a warm sensation when vigorously applied, or a cool sensation when applied gently, indicating its properties as a counterirritant. The action on nerve endings also induces a slight local analgesia.

=== Respiratory aerosol ===
Camphor is also used via an aerosol, typically by steam inhalation, sometimes in the form of branded nasal inhaler sticks, to inhibit coughing and relieve upper airway congestion due to the common cold. However, the clinical efficacy of these remedies is challenged.

=== Other niche uses ===
Camphor is used by marksmen to blacken the front and rear sights of rifles to prevent the sights from reflecting. This is done by setting light to a small amount of camphor, which burns at a relatively low temperature, and using the soot rising from the flame to deposit a coating on a surface held above it. Historically, this soot blackening was also used to coat barograph record charts.

=== Pest deterrent and preservative ===
Camphor is believed to be toxic to insects and is thus sometimes used as a repellent. Camphor is an active ingredient in some mothballs and it is also sometimes used as an alternative to them. Camphor crystals are sometimes used to prevent damage to insect collections by other small insects. It is kept in clothes used on special occasions and festivals, and also in cupboard corners as a cockroach repellent. The smoke of camphor crystal or camphor incense sticks can be used as an environmentally-friendly mosquito repellent.

Recent studies have indicated that camphor essential oil can be used as an effective fumigant against red fire ants, as it affects the attacking, climbing, and feeding behavior of major and minor workers.

Camphor is also used as an antimicrobial substance. Camphor and camphor-containing essential oils have historically been used to prevent spoilage of food. In embalming, camphor oil was one of the ingredients used by ancient Egyptians for mummification.

=== Perfume ===
In the ancient Arab world, camphor was a common perfume ingredient. The aroma of both the racemic mixture and laevo enantiomer are described as "camphoreous", whereas the dextro enantiomer exhibits a more complex aroma described as camphoreous, minty, phenolic, herbal, woody, medicinal, mentholic, cooling, and green.

The Chinese referred to the best camphor as "dragon's brain perfume", due to its "pungent and portentous aroma" and "centuries of uncertainty over its provenance and mode of origin".

=== Culinary uses ===
One of the earliest known recipes for ice cream dating to the Tang dynasty includes camphor as an ingredient. It was used to flavor leavened bread in ancient Egypt. In ancient and medieval Europe, camphor was used as an ingredient in sweets. It was used in a wide variety of both savory and sweet dishes in medieval Arabic language cookbooks, such as Kitāb al-Ṭabīkh compiled by ibn Sayyār al-Warrāq in the 10th century. It also was used in sweet and savory dishes in the Ni'matnama, according to a book written in the late 15th century for the sultans of Mandu. It is a main constituent of a spice known as "edible camphor" (or kapur), which may be used in traditional South Indian desserts like Payasam and Chakkarai Pongal.

=== Religious rites ===
Camphor is widely used in Hindu religious ceremonies. Aarti is performed after placing it on a stand and setting fire to it usually as the last step of puja or devotional worship ritual to one or more deities. Camphor is mentioned in the Quran as being the fragrance of wine given to believers in heaven.

=== Rust inhibition ===
Camphor blocks are a traditional, effective, and inexpensive method to inhibit rust and oxidation on metal tools by releasing fumes within enclosed spaces, such as toolboxes and drawers. Camphor is a volatile corrosion inhibitor (VCI) which slowly evaporates, depositing a microscopic oily film that blocks moisture and rust formation, lasting about 6–12 months.

== Toxicity ==
Applied on skin, camphor may cause allergic reactions in some people; when ingested by mouth, camphor cream or ointment is poisonous. In high ingested doses, camphor produces symptoms of irritability, disorientation, lethargy, muscle spasms, vomiting, abdominal cramps, convulsions, and seizures. Lethal doses by ingestion in adults are in the range 50–500 mg/kg (orally). Generally, ingestion of two grams causes serious toxicity and four grams is potentially lethal.

Airborne camphor may be toxic if respired by humans. The permissible exposure limit (PEL) for camphor in ambient air is 2 mg/m^{3} at exposure time (TWA) not more than 8 hours. 200 mg/m^{3} is considered a very dangerous concentration (IDLH).

== History of synthetic camphor ==
When its use in the nascent chemical industries (discussed below) greatly increased the volume of demand in the late 19th century, potential for changes in supply and in price followed. In 1911 Robert Kennedy Duncan, an industrial chemist and educator, related that the Imperial Japanese government had recently (1907–1908) tried to monopolize the production of natural camphor as a forest product in Asia but that the monopoly was prevented by the development of the total synthesis alternatives, which began in "purely academic and wholly uncommercial" form with Gustav Komppa's first report:

"... but it sealed the fate of the Japanese monopoly ... For no sooner was it accomplished than it excited the attention of a new army of investigators—the industrial chemists. The patent offices of the world were soon crowded with alleged commercial syntheses of camphor, and of the favored processes companies were formed to exploit them, factories resulted, and in the incredibly short time of two years after its academic synthesis artificial camphor, every whit as good as the natural product, entered the markets of the world ... And yet artificial camphor does not—and cannot—displace the natural product to an extent sufficient to ruin the camphor-growing industry. Its sole present and probable future function is to act as a permanent check to monopolization, to act as a balance-wheel to regulate prices within reasonable limits."

This ongoing check on price growth was confirmed in 1942 in a monograph on DuPont's history, where William S. Dutton said, "Indispensable in the manufacture of pyroxylin plastics, natural camphor imported from Formosa and selling normally for about 50 cents a pound, reached the high price of $3.75 in 1918 [amid the global trade disruption and high explosives demand that World War I created]. The organic chemists at DuPont replied by synthesizing camphor from the turpentine of southern US pine stumps, with the result that the price of industrial camphor sold in carload lots in 1939 was between 32 cents and 35 cents a pound."

The background of Gustaf Komppa's synthesis was as follows. In the 19th century, it was known that nitric acid oxidizes camphor into camphoric acid. Haller and Blanc published a semisynthesis of camphor from camphoric acid. Although they demonstrated its structure, they were unable to prove it. The first complete total synthesis of camphoric acid was published by Komppa in 1903. Its inputs were diethyl oxalate and 3,3-dimethylpentanoic acid, which reacted by Claisen condensation to yield diketocamphoric acid. Methylation with methyl iodide and a complicated reduction procedure produced camphoric acid. William Perkin published another synthesis a short time later. Previously, some organic compounds (such as urea) had been synthesized in the laboratory as a proof of concept, but camphor was a scarce natural product with a worldwide demand. Komppa realized this, and began industrial production of camphor in Tainionkoski, Finland, in 1907 (with plenty of competition, as Kennedy Duncan reported).

A different way of synthesis was developed at the same time by Dr. Karl Stephan from Chemische Fabrik auf Actien. This chemist, who had patented a route to synthesize camphene in 1902, found out that borneol or isoborneol could easily be oxidized with permanganate in benzene solution with unprecedentedly high yields of 95+%, and patented it in 1903. The process was efficient enough to compete with natural camphor, and Japan was forced to lower prices in 1907, but the German company still increased its production, reaching 623 tons in 1913, only to be interrupted by the First World War.

== See also ==
- Bornane
- 1,4-Dichlorobenzene
- Citral
- Eucalyptol
- Lavender
- Vaporizer
