= List of compounds with carbon number 10 =

This is a partial list of molecules that contain 10 carbon atoms.

Chemical formula	Synonyms	CAS number
C_{10}Cl_{10}	dienochlor	2227–17–0
C_{10}Cl_{10}O	kepone	143–50–0
C_{10}F_{8}	perfluoronaphthalene	313–72–4
C_{10}F_{14}O	perfluoroadamantanone	141635–73–6
C_{10}F_{18}	perfluorodecalin	306–94–5
C_{10}F_{21}I	perfluorodecyl iodide	423–62–1
C_{10}H_{4}Cl_{8}O	oxychlordane	26880–48–8
C_{10}H_{5}Cl_{7}	heptachlor	76–44–8
C_{10}H_{5}Cl_{7}O	heptachlor epoxide	1024–57–3
C_{10}H_{5}Cu	copper phenylethynylacetylenide	65792–84–9
C_{10}H_{5}F_{15}O_{2}	ethyl perfluorooctanonate	3108–24–5
C_{10}H_{6}Cl_{2}	dichloro naphthalene	2050–69–3
C_{10}H_{6}N_{2}OS_{2}	quinomethionate	2439–01–2
C_{10}H_{6}N_{2}O_{8}S	flavianic acid	483–84–1
C_{10}H_{6}N_{4}O_{2}	alloxazine	490–59–5
C_{10}H_{6}O_{3}	phenylmaleic anhydride	36122–35–7
C_{10}H_{7}Cl_{2}NO	chloro quinaldol	72–80–0
C_{10}H_{7}Cl_{2}N_{3}O	anagrelide	68475–42–3
C_{10}H_{7}Cl_{5}O	tridiphane	58138–08–2
C_{10}H_{7}Cl_{7}	dihydroheptachlor	2589–15–3
C_{10}H_{7}N_{1}O_{3}	kynurenic acid	492–27–3
C_{10}H_{7}N_{3}S	thiabendazole	148–79–8
C_{10}H_{8}	azulene	275–51–4
C_{10}H_{8}	naphthalene	91–20–3
C_{10}H_{8}ClN_{3}O	pyrazon	1698–60–8
C_{10}H_{8}ClN_{3}O_{2}	drazoxolon	5707–69–7
C_{10}H_{8}Cl_{4}	tetrachloro tetrahydro naphthalene	1203–38–9
C_{10}H_{8}N_{2}	1,4-benzenediacetonitrile	622–75–3
C_{10}H_{8}N_{2}	phenylsuccinonitrile	13706–68–8
C_{10}H_{8}N_{4}O_{5}	picrolonic acid	550–74–3
C_{10}H_{8}O_{2}	phenylpropynoic acid methyl ester	4891–38–7
C_{10}H_{8}O_{3}	monophenyl succinic anhydride	1131–15–3
C_{10}H_{8}O_{4}	cis piperonylacrylic acid	75684–35–4
C_{10}H_{8}O_{4}	scopoletin	92–61–5
C_{10}H_{9}ClFeHg	chloro mercuri ferrocene	1273–75–2
C_{10}H_{9}ClO_{3}	acetylmandelic chloride	1638–63–7
C_{10}H_{9}Cl_{4}NO_{2}S	captafol	2425–06–1
C_{10}H_{9}Cl_{4}NO_{2}S	captafol	2939–80–2
C_{10}H_{9}Cl_{4}O_{4}P	tetrachlorvinphos	22248–79–9
C_{10}H_{9}MoNO_{5}	isocyanobutanemolybdenum pentacarbonyl	21077–27–0
C_{10}H_{9}N	naphthylamine	25168–10–9
C_{10}H_{9}N	vinylphenylacetonitrile	110013–89–3
C_{10}H_{9}NO_{3}S	probenazole	27605–76–1
C_{10}H_{9}NO_{5}W	isocyanobutanetungsten pentacarbonyl	21077–26–9
C_{10}H_{10}	bullvalene	1005–51–2
C_{10}H_{10}	diisopropenyldiacetylene	5187–81–5
C_{10}H_{10}Cl_{2}Nb	niobocene dichloride	12793–14–5
C_{10}H_{10}Cl_{2}Ti	titanocene dichloride	1271–19–8
C_{10}H_{10}Co	cobaltocene	1277–43–6
C_{10}H_{10}F_{6}FeP	ferrocenium hexafluorophosphate	11077–24–0
C_{10}H_{10}Fe	ferrocene	102–54–5
C_{10}H_{10}Hg	mercurocene	12083–67–9
C_{10}H_{10}Mg	magnesocene	1284–72–6
C_{10}H_{10}N_{4}O_{2}S	sulfadiazine	68–35–9
C_{10}H_{10}Ni	nickelocene	1271–28–9
C_{10}H_{10}O	bullvalone	15719–09–2
C_{10}H_{10}O	cyclopropyl phenyl ketone	3481–02–5
C_{10}H_{10}O_{2}	cinnamyl formate	104–65–4
C_{10}H_{10}O_{2}	methylbenzylglyoxal	38087–02–4
C_{10}H_{10}O_{3}	phenacylacetate	2243–35–8
C_{10}H_{10}O_{4}	benzylmalonic acid	616–75–1
C_{10}H_{10}O_{4}	dimethyl phthalate	131–11–3
C_{10}H_{10}O_{4}	piperonyl acetate	326–61–4
C_{10}H_{10}O_{4}	pyrocatechol diacetate	635–67–6
C_{10}H_{10}Os	osmocene	1273–81–0
C_{10}H_{10}Pb	plumbocene	1294–74–2
C_{10}H_{10}Sn	stannocene	1294–75–3
C_{10}H_{10}V	vanadocene	1277–47–0
C_{10}H_{11}BrN_{2}O_{3}	brallobarbital	561–86–4
C_{10}H_{11}ClO_{3}	clofibric acid	882–09–7
C_{10}H_{11}ClN_{4}	acetamiprid	135410–20–7
C_{10}H_{11}F_{3}N_{2}O_{3}S	fluoridamid	47000–92–0
C_{10}H_{11}F_{5}OSi	ethanol dmpfps	71338–73–3
C_{10}H_{11}IO_{4}	iodobenzene diacetate	3240–34–4
C_{10}H_{11}N	benzenebutanenitrile	2046–18–6
C_{10}H_{11}NO	cyclopropiophenone oxime	7555–72–8
C_{10}H_{11}NO_{3}	ethyl oxanilate	1457–85–8
C_{10}H_{11}N_{3}O_{2}S_{2}	sulfasomizole	632–00–8
C_{10}H_{11}N_{3}O_{5}S	nifuratel	4936–47–4
C_{10}H_{11}N_{4}Na_{2}O_{8}P	disodium inosinate	4691–65–0
C_{10}H_{12}	cyclopropylphenylmethane	1667–00–1
C_{10}H_{12}	tetralin	119–64–2
C_{10}H_{12}ClNO	beclamide	501–68–8
C_{10}H_{12}ClNO_{2}	carbanolate	671–04–5
C_{10}H_{12}ClNO_{2}	chlorpropham	101–21–3
C_{10}H_{12}ClN_{3}O_{2}	tranid	15271–41–7
C_{10}H_{12}F_{3}N	norfenfluramine	1886–26–6
C_{10}H_{12}N_{2}O	biacetyl phenylhydrazone	13732–32–6
C_{10}H_{12}N_{2}O	cotinine	486–56–6
C_{10}H_{12}N_{2}O_{3}	allobarbital	52–43–7
C_{10}H_{12}N_{2}O_{3}S	bentazone	25057–89–0
C_{10}H_{12}N_{2}O_{8}	orotidine	314–50–1
C_{10}H_{12}N_{4}OS	thiacetazone	104–06–3
C_{10}H_{12}N_{4}O_{5}	inosine	58–63–9
C_{10}H_{12}O	anethole	4180–23–8
C_{10}H_{12}O	cinnamyl methyl ether	16277–67–1
C_{10}H_{12}O	cyclopropyl phenylmethanol	1007–03–0
C_{10}H_{12}O	isopropyl phenyl ketone	611–70–1
C_{10}H_{12}O_{2}	eugenol	97–53–0
C_{10}H_{12}O_{3}	acetonylguaiacol	6437–46–3
C_{10}H_{12}O_{3}	anisyl acetate	1331–83–5
C_{10}H_{12}O_{3}	ethyl anisate	94–30–4
C_{10}H_{12}O_{4}	cantharidin	56–25–7
C_{10}H_{12}O_{4}	diallyl maleate	999–21–3
C_{10}H_{12}O_{4}	methyl everninate	520–43–4
C_{10}H_{12}S_{4}	tetramethyltetrathiafulvalene	50708–37–7
C_{10}H_{12}Se_{4}	tetramethyltetraselenafulvalene	55259–49–9
C_{10}H_{13}ClN_{2}	chlordimeform	6164–98–3
C_{10}H_{13}ClN_{2}O_{2}	metoxuron	19937–59–8
C_{10}H_{13}ClN_{6}	procyazine	32889–48–8
C_{10}H_{13}ClO	chlorothymol	89–68–9
C_{10}H_{13}Cl_{2}FN_{2}O_{2}S_{2}	tolylfluanid	731–27–1
C_{10}H_{13}NO	isobutyranilide	4406–41–1
C_{10}H_{13}NO_{2}	butyl nicotinate	6938–06–3
C_{10}H_{13}NO_{2}	homarylamine	451–77–4
C_{10}H_{13}NO_{2}	tenamfetamine	51497–09–7
C_{10}H_{13}N_{5}O_{2}	guanosine	118–00–3
C_{10}H_{13}N_{5}O_{3}	deoxyadenosine	958–09–8
C_{10}H_{13}N_{5}O_{4}	adenosine	58–61–7
C_{10}H_{13}N_{5}O_{4}	deoxyguanosine	961–07–9
C_{10}H_{14}	cymene	25155–15–1
C_{10}H_{14}	diethyl benzene	25340–17–4
C_{10}H_{14}	tetrahydrotriquinacene	57595–39–8
C_{10}H_{14}ClN	clotermine	10389–73–8
C_{10}H_{14}Cl_{2}NO_{2}PS	zytron	299–85–4
C_{10}H_{14}MoO_{6}	molybdenyl acetylacetonate	17524–05–9
C_{10}H_{14}N	nicotine	16760–37–5
C_{10}H_{14}N_{2}	nicotine	23950–04–1
C_{10}H_{14}N_{2}O	nikethamide	59–26–7
C_{10}H_{14}N_{2}O_{2}S	methallatal	115–56–0
C_{10}H_{14}N_{2}O_{4}S_{2}	sultiame	61–56–3
C_{10}H_{14}N_{2}O_{5}	thymidine	50–89–5
C_{10}H_{14}N_{4}O_{2}	morinamide	952–54–5
C_{10}H_{14}N_{4}O_{3}	proxyphylline	603–00–9
C_{10}H_{14}N_{4}O_{4}	diprophylline	479–18–5
C_{10}H_{14}NiO_{4}	nickel acetylacetonate	3264–82–2
C_{10}H_{14}O	benzenebutanol	3360–41–6
C_{10}H_{14}O	butoxybenzene	1126–79–0
C_{10}H_{14}O	carvone	99–49–0
C_{10}H_{14}O	carvone	6485–40–1
C_{10}H_{14}O	chrysantenone	473–06–3
C_{10}H_{14}O	durenol	527–35–5
C_{10}H_{14}O	eucarvone	503–93–5
C_{10}H_{14}O	isopiperitenone	529–01–1
C_{10}H_{14}O	menthofuran	494–90–6
C_{10}H_{14}O	myrtenal	23727–16–4
C_{10}H_{14}O	perillaldehyde	2111–75–3
C_{10}H_{14}O	pinocarvone	34–41–3
C_{10}H_{14}O	piperitenone	491–09–8
C_{10}H_{14}O	prehnitenol	488–70–0
C_{10}H_{14}O	verbenone	18309–32–5
C_{10}H_{14}O_{2}	carvone oxide	33204–74–9
C_{10}H_{14}O_{2}	durohydroquinone	527–18–4
C_{10}H_{14}O_{2}	elsholtzia ketone	488–05–1
C_{10}H_{14}O_{2}	nepetalactone	490–10–8
C_{10}H_{14}O_{2}	perilla ketone	553–84–4
C_{10}H_{14}O_{3}	ethyl vanillylether	13184–86–6
C_{10}H_{14}O_{3}	ethylsyringol	29515–37–5
C_{10}H_{14}O_{3}	mephenesin	59–47–2
C_{10}H_{14}O_{4}	adipic acid divinyl ester	4074–90–2
C_{10}H_{14}O_{4}	diallyl succinate	925–16–6
C_{10}H_{14}S	butylthiobenzene	1126–80–3
C_{10}H_{14}S	isobutyl phenyl sulfide	13307–61–4
C_{10}H_{14}Si	vinyldimethylphenylsilane	1125–26–4
C_{10}H_{15}N	benzenebutanamine	13214–66–9
C_{10}H_{15}N	geranonitrile	5585–39–7
C_{10}H_{15}N	methamphetamine	537–46–2
C_{10}H_{15}N	phenpromethamine	93–88–9
C_{10}H_{15}NO	ephedrine	299–42–3
C_{10}H_{15}NO	hordenine	539–15–1
C_{10}H_{15}NO	perillartine	30950–27–7
C_{10}H_{15}NO_{2}	etilefrine	709–55–7
C_{10}H_{15}NO_{2}	hydroxyephedrine	365–26–4
C_{10}H_{15}N_{3}	modaline	2856–74–8
C_{10}H_{15}N_{5}	fenformin	114–86–3
C_{10}H_{15}OPS_{2}	fonofos	944–22–9
C_{10}H_{15}O_{3}PS_{2}	fenthion	55–38–9
C_{10}H_{15}O_{4}P	diethyl phenyl phosphate	2510–86–3
C_{10}H_{15}P	diethylphenylphosphine	1605–53–4
C_{10}H_{16}	adamantane	281–23–2
C_{10}H_{16}	alpha cis ocimene	6874–44–8
C_{10}H_{16}	α-myrcene	1686–30–2
C_{10}H_{16}	β-myrcene	123–35–3
C_{10}H_{16}	beta phellandrene	555–10–2
C_{10}H_{16}	beta terpinene	99–84–3
C_{10}H_{16}	bornylene	464–17–5
C_{10}H_{16}	camphene	79–92–5
C_{10}H_{16}	cis ocimene	3338–55–4
C_{10}H_{16}	cyclodecyne	3022–41–1
C_{10}H_{16}	isolimonene	5113–87–1
C_{10}H_{16}	limonene	138–86–3
C_{10}H_{16}	perhydrotriquinacene	17760–91–7
C_{10}H_{16}	protoadamantane	53130–19–1
C_{10}H_{16}	santolina triene	2153–66–4
C_{10}H_{16}	trans ocimene	3779–61–1
C_{10}H_{16}Br_{2}N_{2}O_{2}	pipobroman	54–91–1
C_{10}H_{16}Cl_{2}O_{2}	decanedioyl dichloride	111–19–3
C_{10}H_{16}Cl_{3}NOS	triallate	2303–17–5
C_{10}H_{16}NO_{3}PS	aminoparathion	3735–01–1
C_{10}H_{16}NO_{5}PS_{2}	famophos	52–85–7
C_{10}H_{16}N_{2}	decanedinitrile	1871–96–1
C_{10}H_{16}N_{2}	hexyl pyrazine	28217–91–6
C_{10}H_{16}N_{2}	hystrine	18017–50–0
C_{10}H_{16}N_{2}O	smipine	52196–11–9
C_{10}H_{16}N_{2}O_{3}	butabarbital	125–40–6
C_{10}H_{16}N_{2}O_{3}	butethal	77–28–1
C_{10}H_{16}N_{2}O_{3}S	biotin	58–85–5
C_{10}H_{16}N_{2}O_{8}	EDDS	20486–91–7
C_{10}H_{16}N_{5}O_{13}P_{3}	adenosine triphosphate	56–65–5
C_{10}H_{16}N_{6}O_{19}	dipentaerythritol hexanitrate	13184–80–0
C_{10}H_{16}N_{6}S	cimetidine	51481–61–9
C_{10}H_{16}O	artemiseole	60485–46–3
C_{10}H_{16}O	artemisia ketone	546–49–6
C_{10}H_{16}O	camphor	76–22–2
C_{10}H_{16}O	caranone	4176–04–9
C_{10}H_{16}O	carvotanaceton	499–71–8
C_{10}H_{16}O	citral	5392–40–5
C_{10}H_{16}O	dihydrocarvone	5948–04–9
C_{10}H_{16}O	dihydrocarvone	7764–50–3
C_{10}H_{16}O	epicamphor	10292–98–5
C_{10}H_{16}O	hotrienol	29957–43–5
C_{10}H_{16}O	ipsdienol	35628–00–3
C_{10}H_{16}O	isocyclocitral	1335–66–6
C_{10}H_{16}O	isopinocamphone	473–62–1
C_{10}H_{16}O	isopulegone	29606–79–9
C_{10}H_{16}O	lyratol	19889–92–0
C_{10}H_{16}O	myrtanal	4764–14–1
C_{10}H_{16}O	neroloxide	1786–08–9
C_{10}H_{16}O	phellandral	21391–98–0
C_{10}H_{16}O	pinocarveol	5947–36–4
C_{10}H_{16}O	piperitone	89–81–6
C_{10}H_{16}O	pulegone	89–82–7
C_{10}H_{16}O	pulegone	15932–80–6
C_{10}H_{16}O	thujol	35732–37–7
C_{10}H_{16}O	thujone	1125–12–8
C_{10}H_{16}OSi	ethoxydimethyl phenylsilane	1825–58–7
C_{10}H_{16}O_{2}	butyl sorbate	7367–78–4
C_{10}H_{16}O_{2}	diosphenol	490–03–9
C_{10}H_{16}O_{2}	iridomyrmecin	485–43–8
C_{10}H_{16}O_{2}	lilac aldehyde a	53447–45–3
C_{10}H_{16}O_{2}	lilac aldehyde b	53447–46–4
C_{10}H_{16}O_{2}	limonene dioxide	96–08–2
C_{10}H_{16}O_{2}	massoialactone	51154–96–2
C_{10}H_{16}O_{2}	nerolic acid	4613–38–1
C_{10}H_{16}O_{2}	piperitone oxide	5286–38–4
C_{10}H_{16}O_{3}	pinonic acid	61826–55–9
C_{10}H_{16}O_{3}	triethylsuccinic anhydride	75125–36–9
C_{10}H_{16}O_{4}	diethyl isopropylidenemalonate	6802–75–1
C_{10}H_{16}O_{6}	triethyl methanetricarboxylate	6279–86–3
C_{10}H_{16}S	thiocamphor	7519–74–6
C_{10}H_{17}Cl	bornyl chloride	464–41–5
C_{10}H_{17}Cl_{3}O_{2}	octyl trichloroacetate	16958–78–4
C_{10}H_{17}N	cyclohexanebutyronitrile	4441–66–1
C_{10}H_{17}NO_{3}	ecgonine methyl ester	7143–09–1
C_{10}H_{17}N_{2}O_{4}PS	etrimfos	38260–54–7
C_{10}H_{17}N_{5}O_{6}	pentaglycine	7093–67–6
C_{10}H_{18}	cyclodecene	3618–12–0
C_{10}H_{18}	ethylidenecyclooctane	19780–51–9
C_{10}H_{18}	methylenecyclononane	56133–38–1
C_{10}H_{18}	methylhydrindan	19744–65–1
C_{10}H_{18}	thujane	471–12–5
C_{10}H_{18}ClN_{5}	ipazine	1912–25–0
C_{10}H_{18}Cl_{2}O_{2}	octyl dichloroacetate	83004–98–2
C_{10}H_{18}O	artemisia alcohol	27644–04–8
C_{10}H_{18}O	borneol	507–70–0
C_{10}H_{18}O	camphene hydrate	465–31–6
C_{10}H_{18}O	carvomenthone	499–70–7
C_{10}H_{18}O	cis rose oxide	16409–43–1
C_{10}H_{18}O	cyclodecanone	1502–06–3
C_{10}H_{18}O	eucalyptol	470–82–6
C_{10}H_{18}O	fenchyl alcohol	1632–73–1
C_{10}H_{18}O	fragranol	30346–21–5
C_{10}H_{18}O	grandisol	26532–22–9
C_{10}H_{18}O	ipsenol	35628–05–8
C_{10}H_{18}O	isogeraniol	5944–20–7
C_{10}H_{18}O	isomenthone	491–07–6
C_{10}H_{18}O	isomenthone	18309–28–9
C_{10}H_{18}O	isopulegol	7786–67–6
C_{10}H_{18}O	menthone	89–80–5
C_{10}H_{18}O	neodihydrocarveol	18675–34–8
C_{10}H_{18}O	piperitol	491–04–3
C_{10}H_{18}O	sabinene hydrate	546–79–2
C_{10}H_{18}O	santolina alcohol	21149–19–9
C_{10}H_{18}O	terpineol	8006–39–1
C_{10}H_{18}O	yomogi alcohol	30458–12–9
C_{10}H_{18}O_{2}	allyl heptanoate	142–19–8
C_{10}H_{18}O_{2}	citronellic acid	502–47–6
C_{10}H_{18}O_{2}	cyclohexanecarboxylic acid isopropyl ester	6553–80–6
C_{10}H_{18}O_{2}	cyclooctanol acetate	772–60–1
C_{10}H_{18}O_{2}	decalinhydroperoxide	4181–83–3
C_{10}H_{18}O_{2}	sobrerol	498–71–5
C_{10}H_{18}O_{2}	tagetonol	71547–63–2
C_{10}H_{18}O_{3}	valeric anhydride	2082–59–9
C_{10}H_{18}O_{4}	decanedioic acid	111–20–6
C_{10}H_{18}O_{4}	diethyl propylmalonate	2163–48–6
C_{10}H_{18}O_{4}	hexanedioic acid monoethyl ester	14113–01–0
C_{10}H_{18}O_{4}	succinic acid diisopropyl ester	924–88–9
C_{10}H_{18}O_{4}	triethylbutanedioic acid	2103–18–6
C_{10}H_{19}BrO_{2}	octyl bromoacetate	38674–98–5
C_{10}H_{19}ClNO_{5}P	phosphamidon	13171–21–6
C_{10}H_{19}ClO	decanoyl chloride	112–13–0
C_{10}H_{19}ClO_{2}	octyl chloroacetate	5451–98–9
C_{10}H_{19}N	decanenitrile	1975–78–6
C_{10}H_{19}NO	lupinine	486–70–4
C_{10}H_{19}NO_{2}	diethylaminoethyl methacrylate	105–16–8
C_{10}H_{19}NS	nonyl isothiocyanate	4430–43–7
C_{10}H_{19}N_{3}O_{4}	leucylglycylglycine	1187–50–4
C_{10}H_{19}N_{5}O	secbumeton	26259–45–0
C_{10}H_{19}N_{5}S	terbutryn	886–50–0
C_{10}H_{19}O_{6}PS_{2}	malathion	121–75–5
C_{10}H_{19}O_{7}PS	malaoxon	1634–78–2
C_{10}H_{20}	cyclodecane	293–96–9
C_{10}H_{20}	diethylcyclohexane	1331–43–7
C_{10}H_{20}	diisoamylene	54063–09–1
C_{10}H_{20}N_{2}NiS_{4}	nickel diethyldithiocarbamate	52610–81–8
C_{10}H_{20}N_{2}O_{4}	mebutamate	64–55–1
C_{10}H_{20}N_{2}S_{4}	disulfiram	97–77–8
C_{10}H_{20}O	carvomenthol	499–69–4
C_{10}H_{20}O	cyclodecanol	1502–05–2
C_{10}H_{20}O	decanal	112–31–2
C_{10}H_{20}O	dihydromyrcenol	53219–21–9
C_{10}H_{20}O	dihydroterpineol	58985–02–7
C_{10}H_{20}O	isocarvomenthol	3127–80–8
C_{10}H_{20}O	isomenthol	490–99–3
C_{10}H_{20}O	menthol	1490–04–6
C_{10}H_{20}O	neocarvomenthol	1126–40–5
C_{10}H_{20}O	neoisocarvomenthol	42846–32–2
C_{10}H_{20}O	neoisomenthol	491–02–1
C_{10}H_{20}O	rhodinol	6812–78–8
C_{10}H_{20}OSi_{2}	cyclopentadienyl pentamethyl disiloxane	119415–97–3
C_{10}H_{20}O_{2}	decanoic acid	334–48–5
C_{10}H_{20}O_{2}	hydroxycitronellal	107–75–5
C_{10}H_{20}O_{2}	neodecanoic acid	26896–20–8
C_{10}H_{20}O_{2}	terpinol	565–48–0
C_{10}H_{20}O_{2}S	isooctyl mercaptoacetate	25103–09–7
C_{10}H_{20}O_{2}S	octyl thioglycolate	7664–80–4
C_{10}H_{20}O_{2}Si	diallyldiethoxysilane	13081–67–9
C_{10}H_{20}O_{3}	peroxydecanoic acid	14156–10–6
C_{10}H_{20}O_{3}	promoxolane	470–43–9
C_{10}H_{21}N	pempidine	79–55–0
C_{10}H_{21}N	perhydrophentermine	5531–31–7
C_{10}H_{21}N	propylhexedrine	101–40–6
C_{10}H_{21}NO	decanamide	2319–29–1
C_{10}H_{21}N_{3}O	diethylcarbamazine	90–89–1
C_{10}H_{22}	decane	124–18–5
C_{10}H_{22}NO_{3}P	diethyl cyclohexylaminophosphonate	32405–88–2
C_{10}H_{22}N_{4}	dipiperazinylethane	19479–83–5
C_{10}H_{22}O	butyl hexyl ether	54459–71–1
C_{10}H_{22}O	decanol	36729–58–5
C_{10}H_{22}O	heptyl propyl ether	71112–89–5
C_{10}H_{22}O	methyl nonyl ether	7289–51–2
C_{10}H_{22}O	tetrahydrolavandulol	41884–28–0
C_{10}H_{22}O	triisopropylmethanol	51200–83–0
C_{10}H_{22}O_{3}	tripropyl orthoformate	621–76–1
C_{10}H_{22}O_{3}S	pentyl sulfite	2051–05–0
C_{10}H_{23}N	diethylhexylamine	44979–90–0
C_{10}H_{23}NO_{2}	diethylaminoacetaldehyde diethyl acetal	3616–57–7
C_{10}H_{23}N_{3}O_{3}	hypusine	34994–11–1
C_{10}H_{24}OSi	butyloxytriethylsilane	2751–87–3
C_{10}H_{24}O_{3}Si	tripropyloxymethylsilane	5581–66–8
C_{10}H_{25}O_{5}U	uranium pentaethylate	10405–34–2
C_{10}H_{26}N_{4}	spermine	71–44–3
C_{10}H_{30}O_{5}Si_{5}	decamethylcyclopentasiloxane	541–02–6
C_{10}MnO_{10}Tc	manganese technetium decacarbonyl	41375–72–8
C_{10}Mn_{2}O_{10}	dimanganese decacarbonyl	10170–69–1
C_{10}N_{6}	hexacyanobutadiene radical	5104–27–8
C_{10}O_{10}Re_{2}	dirhenium decacarbonyl	14285–68–8
C_{10}O_{10}Tc_{2}	ditechnetium decacarbonyl	78498–97–2

== See also ==
- Carbon number
- List of compounds with carbon number 9
- List of compounds with carbon number 11
