= C10H18O =

The molecular formula C_{10}H_{18}O (molar mass : 154.25 g/mol) may refer to:

- Borneol
- Citronellal
- Eucalyptol
- 2-Decenal
- Fenchol
- Geraniol
- Grandisol
- Lavandulol
- Linalool
- Menthone
- Myrcenol
- Nerol
- 2-Pinanol
- Rose oxide
- Terpinen-4-ol
- Terpineol
