= C10H20O =

The molecular formula C_{10}H_{20}O (molar mass: 156.27 g/mol, exact mass: 156.1514 u) may refer to:

- Citronellol, also called dihydrogeraniol
- Decanal
- 2-Decanone
- Dihydromyrcenol
- Menthol
- Rhodinol
