= Lallemantia royleana =

Scientific classification
- Kingdom: Plantae
- Clade: Tracheophytes
- Clade: Angiosperms
- Clade: Eudicots
- Clade: Asterids
- Order: Lamiales
- Family: Lamiaceae
- Genus: Lallemantia
- Species: L. royleana

Binomial name
- Lallemantia royleana Benth. in Wall.

Species of flowering plant

Lallemantia royleana is a species of flowering plant in the mint family, Lamiaceae. In Iran it is known as balangu shirazi and it is used as a folk medicine treatment for fever and coughs. Its seeds are a good source of polysaccharides, fiber, oil, and protein.

== Description ==
Lallemantia royleana is an annual herb, un-branched or branched from the base. Its stem is erect and long, while leaves are simple. Inflorescence grows near the base of stem. The calyx is tubular and prominently veined or ribbed. The corolla is pale lilac and blue-whitish pink. Nutlets are dark brown with a small attachment scar.

== Distribution ==
Lallemantia royleana is distributed in Afghanistan, China, India, Kazakhstan, Kyrgyzstan, Pakistan, Russia, Tajikistan, Turkmenistan, Uzbekistan, South West Asia, and Europe.

== Constituents ==
Composition of the essential oil of L. royleana aerial parts include sabinene, β-pinene, 3-octanone, myrcene, p-cymene, limonene, 1,8-cineole, (Z)-β-ocimene, (E)-β-ocimene, γ-terpinene, isobutanol, terpinolene, linalool, butanol, dehydro-sabina ketone, iso-3-thujanol, trans-pinocarveol, sabina ketone, pinocarvone, 3-thujen-2-one, myrtenal, myrtenol, verbenone, trans-carveol, cis-sabinene-hydrate acetate, cis-carveol, pulegone, trans-sabinene-hydrate acetate, bornyl acetate, trans-sabinyl acetate, carvacrol, trans-pinocarvyl acetate, dihydrocarvyl acetate, α-longipinene, β-cubebene, α-trans-bergamotene, and spathulenol.
