= OR10A2 =

Protein-coding gene in humans

Identifiers
- Aliases: OR10A2, OR10A2P, OR11-82, OR11-86, OST363, olfactory receptor family 10 subfamily A member 2
- External IDs: MGI: 3030548; GeneCards: OR10A2

Gene location (Human)
| Chr. | Chromosome 11 (human) |
| Band | 11p15.4 | Start | 6,863,057 bp |
| Band | 11p15.4 | End | 6,874,717 bp |

Gene location (Mouse)
| Chr. | Chromosome 7 (mouse) |
| Band | 7|7 E3 | Start | 106,670,188 bp |
| Band | 7|7 E3 | End | 106,677,009 bp |
RNA expression pattern
| Bgee | Human / Mouse (ortholog); Top expressed in: testicle; gonad; primary visual cortex; anterior cingulate cortex / n/a; More reference expression data |
| BioGPS | n/a |
Gene ontology
| Molecular function | G protein-coupled receptor activity; olfactory receptor activity; signal transducer activity |
| Cellular component | integral component of membrane; plasma membrane; membrane |
| Biological process | sensory perception of smell; signal transduction; response to stimulus; detection of chemical stimulus involved in sensory perception of smell; G protein-coupled receptor signaling pathway |
Sources:Amigo / QuickGO
Orthologs
| Databases | NCBI: entry; OMA: entry |
| Species | Human | Mouse |
| Entrez | 341276 | 259035 |
| Ensembl | ENSG00000170790 | ENSMUSG00000049674 |
| UniProt | Q9H208 | Q7TRN0 |
| RefSeq (mRNA) | NM_001004460 | NM_147033 |
| RefSeq (protein) | NP_001004460 | NP_667244 |
| Location (UCSC) | Chr 11: 6.86 – 6.87 Mb | Chr 7: 106.67 – 106.68 Mb |
| PubMed search |
- Wikidata
| View/Edit Human | View/Edit Mouse |

Olfactory receptor family 10 subfamily A member 2 is a protein that in humans is encoded by the OR10A2 gene.

== Function ==
Olfactory receptors interact with odorant molecules in the nose, to initiate a neuronal response that triggers the perception of a smell. The olfactory receptor proteins are members of a large family of G-protein-coupled receptors (GPCR) arising from single coding-exon genes. Olfactory receptors share a 7-transmembrane domain structure with many neurotransmitter and hormone receptors and are responsible for the recognition and G protein-mediated transduction of odorant signals. The olfactory receptor gene family is the largest in the genome. The nomenclature assigned to the olfactory receptor genes and proteins for this organism is independent of other organisms. [provided by RefSeq, Jul 2008].

== Genetic differences ==
OR10A2 (as well as OR6A2 which is located near it on chromosome 11) has been proposed as a candidate gene responsible for the genetic portion of the variation in cilantro preference.
