= C10H20O2 =

The molecular formula C_{10}H_{20}O_{2} may refer to:

- Decanoic acid
- Ethyl octanoate
- Hydroxycitronellal
- p-Menthane-3,8-diol
- Paramenthane hydroperoxide
- Neodecanoic acid
- Octyl acetate
- Pentyl pentanoate
- Terpin
