= C12H22O2 =

The molecular formula C_{12}H_{22}O_{2} (molar mass: 198.30 g/mol) may refer to:

- Citronellyl acetate
- Menthyl acetate, a natural monoterpene which contributes to the smell and flavor of peppermint
- Vinyl neodecanoate, a vinylic monomer
