= Juniperol =

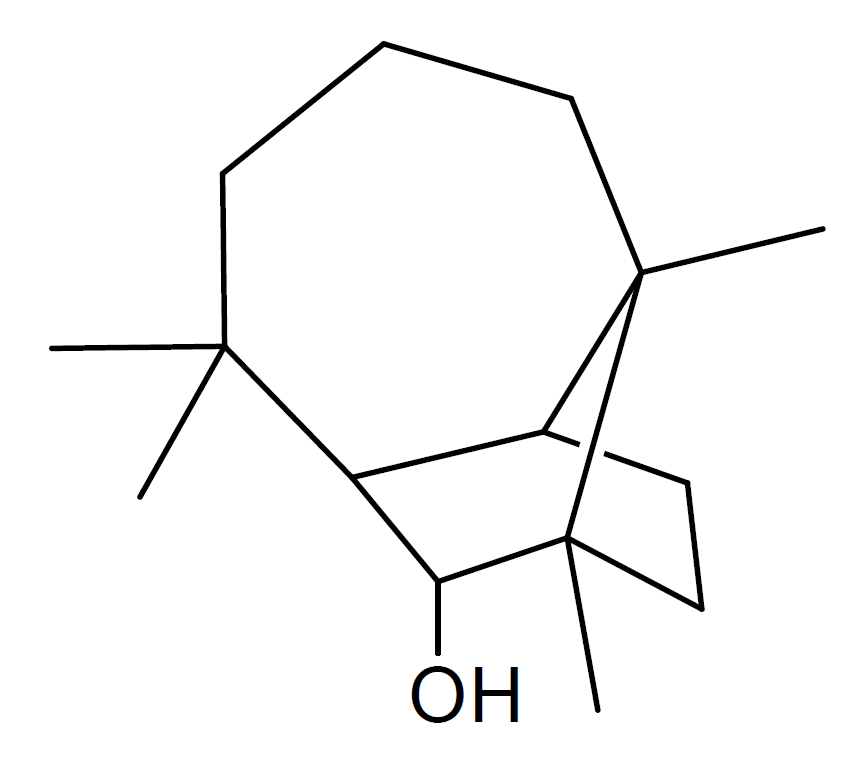

Names
- IUPAC name (1R,3aR,4S,8aS,9S)-1,5,5,8a-tetramethyldecahydro-1,4-methanoazulen-9-ol
- Other names: Macrocarpol; Longiborneol; (+)-Juniperol; (+)-Longiborneol

Identifiers
CAS Number	465-24-7
3D model (JSmol)	Interactive image
ChEBI	CHEBI:172936
PubChem CID	11447401
UNII	6Y2Y2D5L4D
CompTox Dashboard (EPA)	DTXSID001317844
- InChI: InChI=1S/C15H26O/c1-13(2)7-5-8-14(3)10-6-9-15(14,4)12(16)11(10)13/h10-12,16H,5-9H2,1-4H3/t10-,11-,12+,14+,15+/m1/s1 Key: MNNFKQAYXGEKFA-MUGBGTHKSA-N
- SMILES: C[C@@]12[C@]3(C)[C@@H](O)[C@@]([C@]1(CC3)[H])([C@](C)(C)CCC2)[H]

Properties
Chemical formula	C_{15}H_{26}O
Molar mass	222.372 g·mol^{−1}
Appearance	pale yellow crystals
Density	1.04 g/cm^{3}
Melting point	110 °C
Boiling point	130.00 to 150.00 °C
Solubility in water	insoluble

Hazards
Flash point	248.00 °F
- Except where otherwise noted, data are given for materials in their standard state (at 25 °C [77 °F], 100 kPa). Infobox references

Juniperol is a tricyclic terpenoid alcohol with the chemical formula C_{15}H_{26}O. This is one of the primary aromatic and flavor-defining constituents of the essential oil of common juniper (Juniperus communis) berries, which are used as the key botanical in gin production. Juniperol was initially isolated by Mattson in 1913.

== Structure ==
Juniperol is based on a tricyclic cadinane skeleton. It is classified as a sesquiterpenoid, meaning it is built from three isoprene units (C_{15}). Its characteristic aroma is highly dependent on its specific stereochemistry at several chiral centers (the spatial arrangement of atoms). The compound is known as a key contributor to the characteristic "piney," "woody," and "fresh" notes associated with juniper and, by extension, gin.

== Natural occurrence ==
Juniperol is biosynthesized within the glandular tissues of juniper berries and needles via the mevalonate pathway, a common route for terpenoid production.

While most abundant in Juniperus communis, it has also been identified, often in lower concentrations or as different stereoisomers, in the essential oils of other plants within the Cupressaceae family (e.g., certain cypresses and cedars, for example, Cedrus deodara and Cupressus macrocarpa) and in some other aromatic plants like cannabis.

== Physical properties ==
The compound forms white to pale yellow crystals, insoluble in water. However, it is lipophilic (soluble in oils and organic solvents).

== Uses ==
Juniperol is a critical flavor and fragrance molecule, fundamental to the gin's identity. During gin distillation (particularly in the traditional pot still method), juniperol volatilizes and carries over into the distillate, providing the foundational juniper character upon which other botanical notes are layered. The balance of juniperol with other compounds like pinene, myrcene, and terpineol defines the profile of a specific gin.

== See also ==
- Borneol
- Fenchol
- Myrtenol
