= Semapimod =

Chemical compound

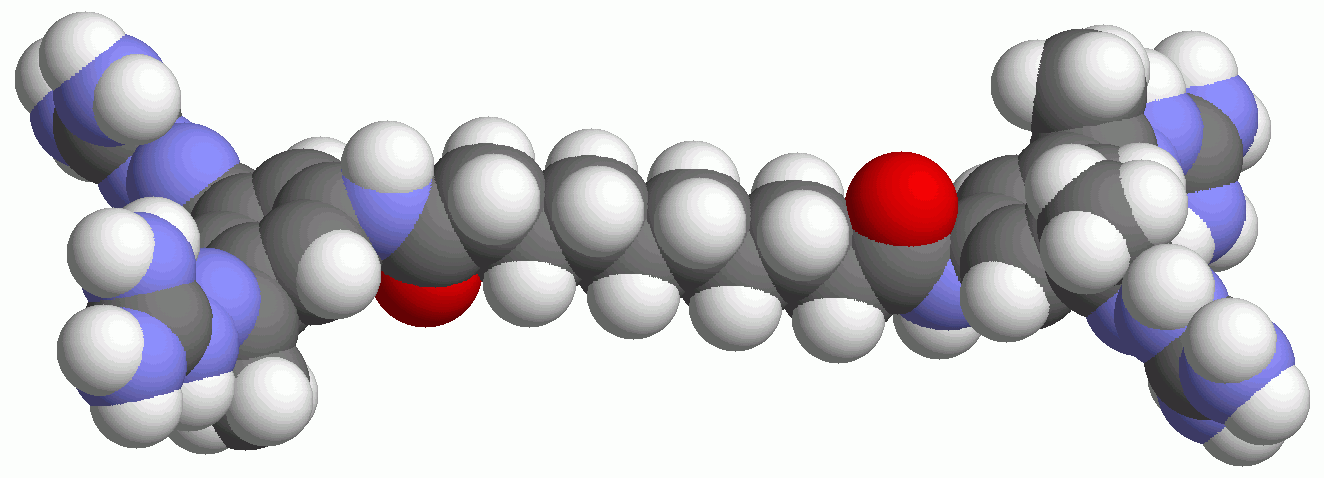

Clinical data
- ATC code: none

Identifiers
- IUPAC name: N,N'-bis[3,5-bis[N-(diaminomethylideneamino)-C-methylcarbonimidoyl]phenyl] decanediamide tetrahydrochloride
- CAS Number: 352513-83-8; Tetrahydrochloride: 164301-51-3
- PubChem CID: 5745214
- UNII: 9SGW2H1K8P; Tetrahydrochloride: A16WYQ522A
- ChEMBL: ChEMBL2107779

Chemical and physical data
- Formula: C_{34}H_{56}Cl_{4}N_{18}O_{2}
- Molar mass: 890.75 g·mol^{−1}
- 3D model (JSmol): Interactive image
- SMILES: CC(=NN=C(N)N)C1=CC(=CC(=C1)NC(=O)CCCCCCCCC(=O)NC2=CC(=CC(=C2)C(=NN=C(N)N)C)C(=NN=C(N)N)C)C(=NN=C(N)N)C.Cl.Cl.Cl.Cl

Semapimod (INN), formerly known as CNI-1493, is an investigational new drug which has anti-inflammatory, anti-cytokine, immunomodulatory, antiviral and antimalarial properties.

== History ==
Semapimod was developed at the former Picower Institute for Medical Research, and is now licensed to Cytokine PharmaSciences. In 2000, Cytokine PharmaSciences licensed anti-infective applications of semapimod to Axxima Pharmaceuticals, but Axxima became insolvent in Dec. 2004 and its assets were acquired by GPC Biotech, which has recently merged into Agennix AG. Although the disposition of Axxima's partial rights to semapimod was not specified in these merger announcements, Cytokine PharmaSciences does not currently list any licensees for semapimod on its website.

== Mechanism of action ==
Semapimod was first developed to inhibit nitric oxide synthesis by inflammatory macrophages, via inhibition of the uptake of arginine which macrophages require for nitric oxide synthesis. Subsequently, it was found that suppression of nitric oxide synthesis occurred even at semapimod concentrations 10-fold less than required for inhibition of arginine uptake, suggesting that this molecule was a more general inhibitor of inflammatory responses. Further work revealed that semapimod suppressed the translation efficiency of tumor necrosis factor production. Specifically, semapimod was found to be an inhibitor of p38 MAP kinase activation. Surprisingly, however, the primary mode of action in vivo is now thought to be via stimulation of the vagus nerve, thereby down-regulating inflammatory pathways via the recently discovered cholinergic anti-inflammatory pathway.

== Pharmacology and clinical trials ==
In a preclinical study in rats, semapimod was found to suppress cytokine-storm induction by the anticancer cytokine interleukin-2 (IL-2) without decreasing its anticancer properties, allow larger doses of IL-2 to be administered. A subsequent phase I trial in humans failed to show an increase in the tolerated dose of IL-2, although indications of pharmacological activity as an inhibitor of tumor necrosis factor production were observed.

In a preliminary clinical trial of semapimod in patients with moderate to severe Crohn's disease, positive clinical changes were observed, including endoscopic improvement, positive responses in some patients not responding to infliximab, healing of fistulae, and indications for tapering of steroids; no significant adverse effects were observed.

In a small clinical trial against post-ERCP pancreatitis, significant suppression was not observed, although investigators observed a significant reduction of the incidence of hyperamylasemia and the levels of post-ERCP amylase.

In the clinical trials above, semapimod tetrahydrochloride was administered by intravenous injection. This route has drawbacks such as dose-limiting phlebitis. Recently Cytokine PharmaSciences has announced the development of novel salt forms of semapimod which are said to be orally absorbable; a phase I clinical trial of one of these salt forms, CPSI-2364, has been completed, and a phase II trial is planned for 2010.

== Chemistry ==
Semapimod is synthesized by reacting 3,5-diacetylaniline with sebacoyl chloride in the presence of pyridine, followed by reaction of the resulting tetraketone with aminoguanidine hydrochloride.
