= Plumbocene =

Names
- IUPAC name Plumbocene
- Other names Lead(II) bis(pentamethylcyclopentadienide)

Identifiers
CAS Number	1294-74-2
3D model (JSmol)	Interactive image
PubChem CID	15344874
- InChI: InChI=1S/2C5H5.Pb/c2*1-2-4-5-3-1;/h2*1-5H; Key: YBXJFWRGENDPSO-UHFFFAOYSA-N
- SMILES: C1=CC(C=C1)[Pb]C2C=CC=C2

Properties
Chemical formula	Pb(C_{5}H_{5})_{2}
Molar mass	337.4 g·mol^{−1}
Boiling point	150 °C (302 °F; 423 K) at 10^{−7} mmHg
- Except where otherwise noted, data are given for materials in their standard state (at 25 °C [77 °F], 100 kPa). verify (what is ?) Infobox references

Plumbocene is an organometallic compound of lead with the chemical formula Pb(C_{5}H_{5})_{2}. It is a member of the class of metallocenes. It is soluble in benzene, acetone, ether, and petroleum ether, and insoluble in water. Plumbocene is stable in cold water.

Gaseous plumbocene is a bent metallocene with angle 135°, similar to stannocene. But crystalline plumbocene can instead adopt a chain structure, similar to manganocene.

Plumbocene is not commercially available. It may be synthesized by the reaction of sodium cyclopentadienide with a lead(II) source such as lead(II) nitrate or lead(II) iodide.

The decamethyl analog, PbCp*_{2} (decamethylplumbocene), and the half-sandwich complexes, Cp*Pb[BF_{4}] (lead(II) pentamethylcyclopentadienide tetrafluoroborate) and Cp*PbCl (lead(II) chloride pentamethylcyclopentadienide), are known as well.
