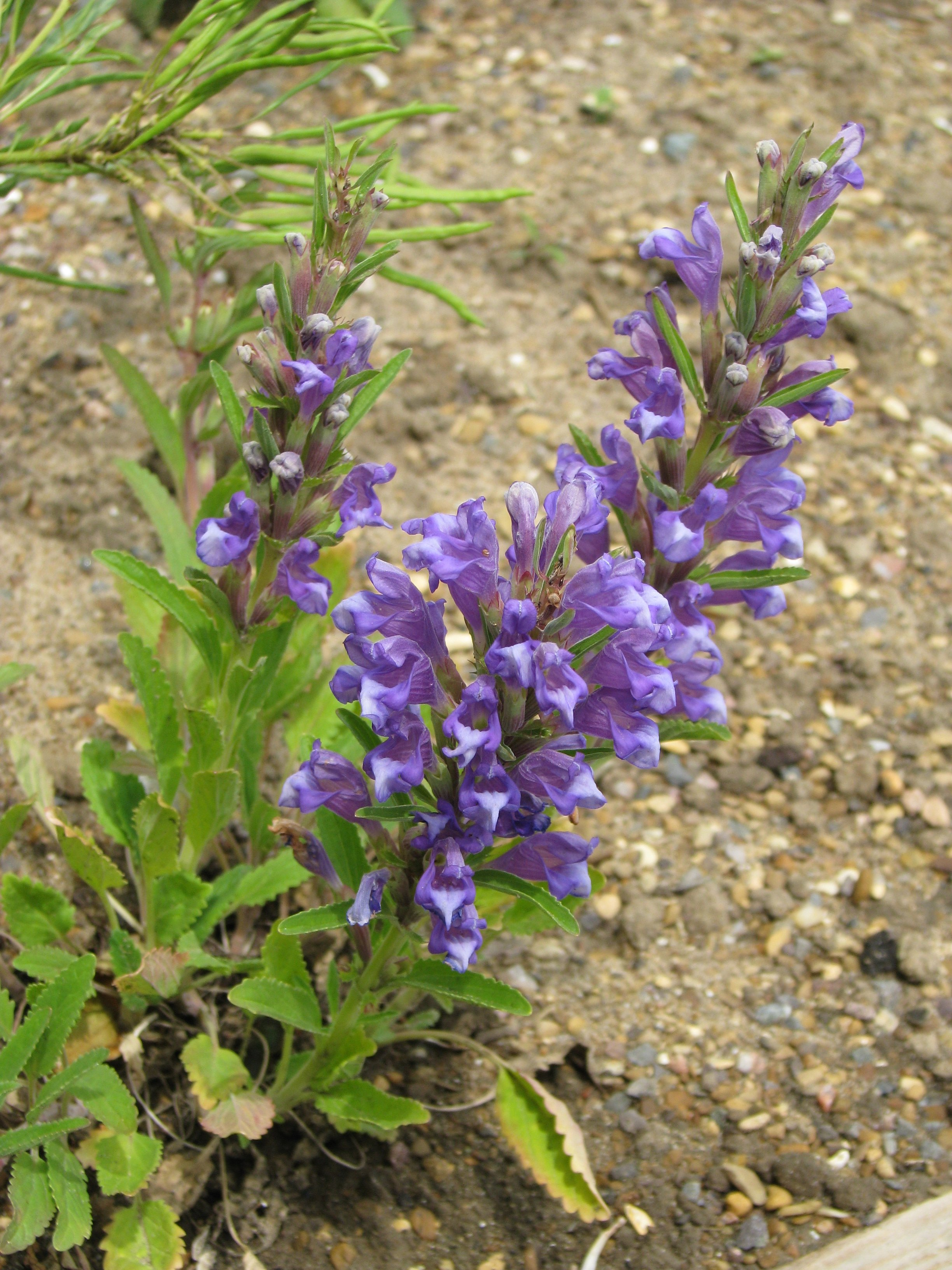
- Lallemantia canescens

Scientific classification
- Kingdom: Plantae
- Clade: Tracheophytes
- Clade: Angiosperms
- Clade: Eudicots
- Clade: Asterids
- Order: Lamiales
- Family: Lamiaceae
- Subfamily: Nepetoideae
- Tribe: Mentheae
- Genus: Lallemantia; Fisch. & C.A.Mey.

Synonyms
- Zornia Moench. 1794 not J.F.Gmel. 1792

= Lallemantia =

Genus of plants

Lallemantia is a genus of flowering plants in the family Lamiaceae. It is named after the German botanist Julius Léopold Eduard Avé-Lallemant.

There are five species in the genus. They are native to central and southwestern Asia. They are annual or biennial herbs. They have been used for various purposes. Lallemantia iberica is cultivated as an oilseed crop.

Species

1. Lallemantia baldshuanica Gontsch. - Iran, Afghanistan, Turkmenistan, Tajikistan, Kyrgyzstan
2. Lallemantia canescens (L.) Fisch. & C.A.Mey. - Turkey, Iran, Caucasus
3. Lallemantia iberica (M.Bieb.) Fisch. & C.A.Mey. - Turkey, Iran, Turkmenistan, Caucasus, Iraq, Syria, Lebanon, Israel
4. Lallemantia peltata (L.) Fisch. & C.A.Mey. - Turkey, Iran, Turkmenistan, Caucasus; Oregon and Wyoming USA (introduced)
5. Lallemantia royleana (Benth.) Benth. - Western Siberia, Central Asia, Xinjiang, Pakistan, Kashmir, Iran, Syria, Saudi Arabia, Persian Gulf sheikdoms
