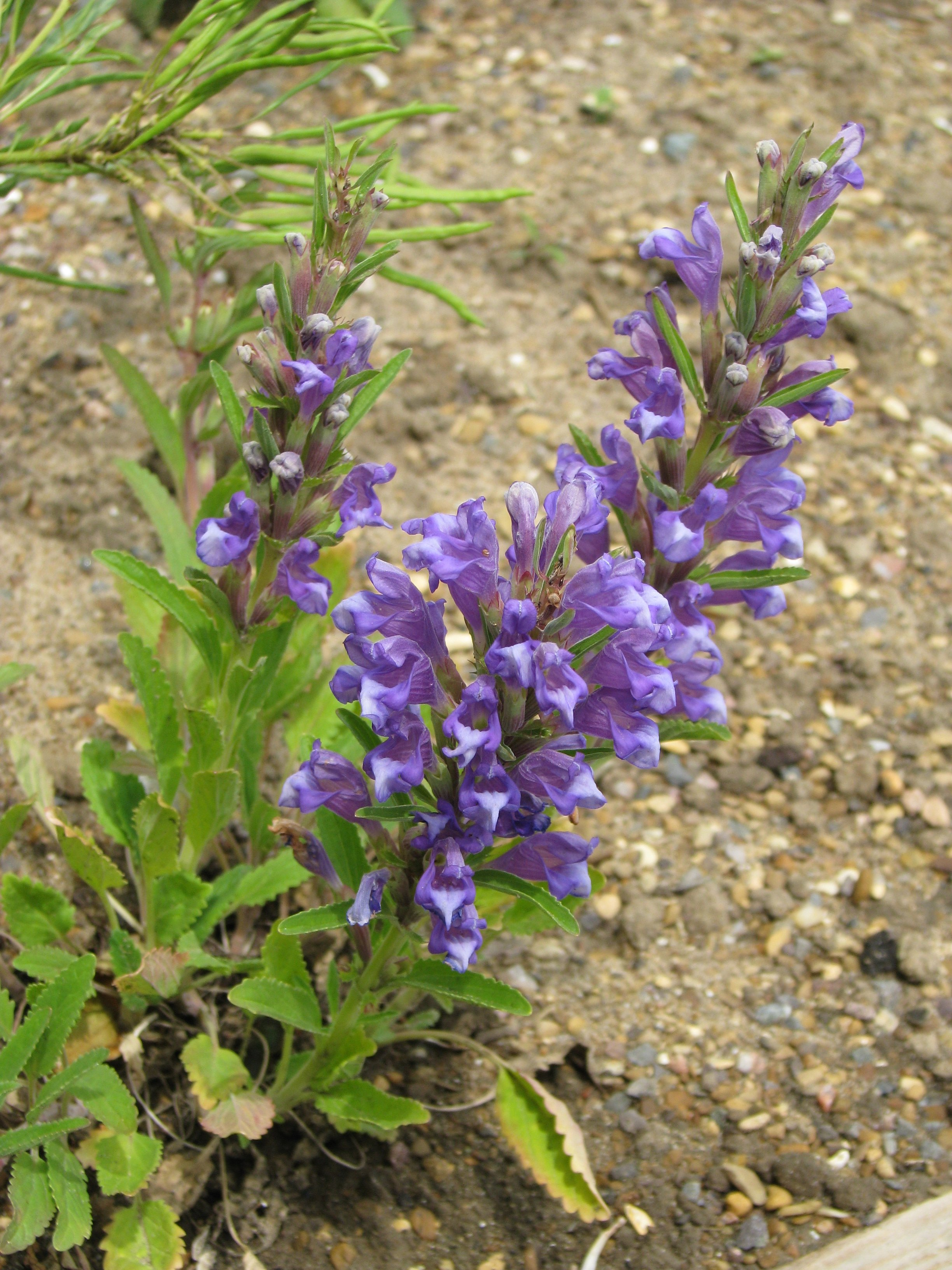

Scientific classification
- Kingdom: Plantae
- Clade: Tracheophytes
- Clade: Angiosperms
- Clade: Eudicots
- Clade: Asterids
- Order: Lamiales
- Family: Lamiaceae
- Genus: Lallemantia
- Species: L. canescens

Binomial name
- Lallemantia canescens (L.) Fisch. & C.A.Mey.

Synonyms
- Dracocephalum canescens L.

= Lallemantia canescens =

Species of plant

Lallemantia canescens is a species of flowering plant in the mint family. Its native range includes Iran, Turkey, Armenia, and Azerbaijan.
