= Julius Léopold Eduard Avé-Lallemant =

German botanist

Julius Léopold Eduard Avé-Lallemant (4 July 1803 – 17 May 1867) was a German botanist who was a native of Lübeck.

From 1838 to 1855 he performed his scientific work in St. Petersburg. Botanists Friedrich Ernst Ludwig von Fischer (1782–1854) and Carl Anton von Meyer (1795–1855) named the plant genus Lallemantia from the family Lamiaceae in his honor. Avé-Lallemant was the author of De plantis quibusdam Italiae borealis et Germaniae australis rarioribus (1829). He was also an entomologist.
