= 2-Pinanol =

Names
- Other names 2,6,6-trimethylbicyclo[3.1.1]heptan-2-ol

Identifiers
CAS Number	473-54-1; trans: 4948-29-2; cis: 4948-28-1
3D model (JSmol)	Interactive image; trans: Interactive image; cis: Interactive image
ChemSpider	9723; cis: 4933698
ECHA InfoCard	100.006.789
EC Number	207-466-6
PubChem CID	10128; trans: 1268143; cis: 6428289
UNII	5DZK63N3UU
CompTox Dashboard (EPA)	DTXSID5029180; trans: DTXSID8027583; cis: DTXSID3027582
- InChI: InChI=1S/C10H18O/c1-9(2)7-4-5-10(3,11)8(9)6-7/h7-8,11H,4-6H2,1-3H3 Key: YYWZKGZIIKPPJZ-UHFFFAOYSA-N; trans: InChI=1S/C10H18O/c1-9(2)7-4-5-10(3,11)8(9)6-7/h7-8,11H,4-6H2,1-3H3/t7-,8+,10+/m0/s1 Key: YYWZKGZIIKPPJZ-QXFUBDJGSA-N; cis: InChI=1S/C10H18O/c1-9(2)7-4-5-10(3,11)8(9)6-7/h7-8,11H,4-6H2,1-3H3/t7-,8+,10-/m0/s1 Key: YYWZKGZIIKPPJZ-XKSSXDPKSA-N
- SMILES: CC1(C2CCC(C1C2)(C)O)C; trans: CC1(C)[C@@H]2C[C@H]1[C@](C)(O)CC2; cis: CC1(C)[C@@H]2C[C@H]1[C@@](C)(O)CC2

Properties
Chemical formula	C_{10}H_{18}O
Molar mass	154.253 g·mol^{−1}
Appearance	colorless solid
Melting point	78–79 °C (cis); 58–59 °C (trans

Hazards
- GHS labelling
Pictograms	(GHS06: Toxic) (GHS07: Exclamation mark)
Signal word	Danger
Hazard statements	H302, H311, H312, H315, H319
Precautionary statements	P264, P264+P265, P270, P280, P301+P317, P302+P352, P305+P351+P338, P316, P317, P321, P330, P332+P317, P337+P317, P361+P364, P362+P364, P405, P501
- Except where otherwise noted, data are given for materials in their standard state (at 25 °C [77 °F], 100 kPa). Infobox references

2-Pinanol is a pair of isomeric organic compounds consisting of bicyclic terpenoid. They are obtained from the terpene pinene. Both cis and trans isomers exist. Both are chiral They are produced by hydrogenation of corresponding cis- and trans-2-pinane hydroperoxides, which in turn are produced by autoxidation of pinane with air. Heating 2-pinanol gives linalool.
