= Vinyl neodecanoate =

Names
- Preferred IUPAC name Ethenyl 7,7-dimethyloctanoate
- Other names Neodecanoic acid vinyl ester; VeoVa 10

Identifiers
CAS Number	51000-52-3
3D model (JSmol)	Interactive image
ChemSpider	58783
ECHA InfoCard	100.051.715
EC Number	256-905-8
PubChem CID	162097
UNII	9NDY01YYPT
UN number	3082
CompTox Dashboard (EPA)	DTXSID8029369
- InChI: InChI=1S/C12H22O2/c1-5-14-11(13)9-7-6-8-10-12(2,3)4/h5H,1,6-10H2,2-4H3 Key: TVFJAZCVMOXQRK-UHFFFAOYSA-N
- SMILES: CC(C)(C)CCCCCC(=O)OC=C

Properties
Chemical formula	C_{12}H_{22}O_{2}
Molar mass	198.306 g·mol^{−1}
Appearance	Colorless liquid
Density	0.882 g/mL
Boiling point	60–216 °C (140–421 °F; 333–489 K)

Hazards
- GHS labelling
Pictograms	(GHS07: Exclamation mark)
Signal word	Warning
Hazard statements	H410
Precautionary statements	P273, P391, P501
Flash point	83 °C; 182 °F; 356 K
- Except where otherwise noted, data are given for materials in their standard state (at 25 °C [77 °F], 100 kPa). Infobox references

Vinyl neodecanoate (trade name VeoVa 10) is a vinylic monomer that is virtually always used in combination with other monomers to create latices or emulsion polymers. The trade name is an acronym of Vinyl ester of Versatic Acid with the number 10 meaning 10 carbons in the molecule. It has a medium to low glass transition temperature of -3 °C. Chemically, it is a mixture of isomeric vinyl esters of neodecanoic acid.

== Uses ==
Vinyl neodecanoate is mainly used as a modifying monomer in conjunction with other monomers and particularly the manufacture of vinyl acetate based polymer emulsions by the process of emulsion polymerization. Vinyl neodecanoate-containing polymers are used in decorative emulsion paints, plasters and renders especially in Europe. Vinyl neodecanoate, like most vinyl ester monomers, is very hydrophobic and the structure is highly branched with a tertiary substituted α-carbon. It is used as a hydrophobic co-monomer. This structure renders the polymers produced from it, very resistant to alkali degradation as there is no hydrogen (thus proton producing species) on the α-carbon. They have good resistance to degradation from ultraviolet light. The monomer has even been used to produce vibration dampening resins. It is claimed to produce coatings with high liquid stain repellency.

== See also ==
- Vinyl acetate
- Acrylate polymer
- Waterborne resins
