= OR6A2 =

Protein-coding gene in the species Homo sapiens

Identifiers
- Aliases: OR6A2, I7, OR11-55, OR6A1, OR6A2P, olfactory receptor family 6 subfamily A member 2
- External IDs: OMIM: 608495; MGI: 97432; GeneCards: OR6A2

Gene location (Human)
Chr.	Chromosome 11 (human)
Band	11p15.4	Start	6,791,736 bp
Band	11p15.4	End	6,799,689 bp

Gene location (Mouse)
Chr.	Chromosome 7 (mouse)
Band	7|7 E3	Start	106,594,606 bp
Band	7|7 E3	End	106,605,279 bp
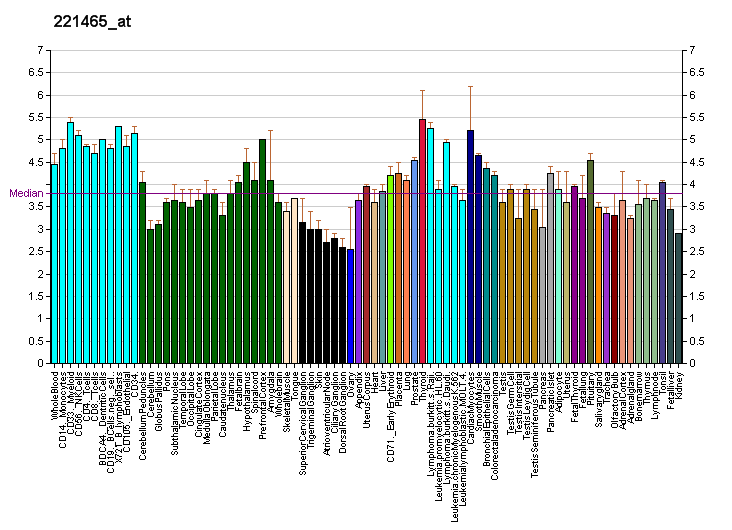
RNA expression pattern
Bgee	Human / Mouse (ortholog); Top expressed in: testicle / Top expressed in: Jacobson's organ; secondary oocyte; yolk sac; peripheral nervous system; gastrula; vastus lateralis muscle; subdivision of respiratory system; respiratory epithelium; nasal epithelium; olfactory epithelium; More reference expression data
BioGPS	More reference expression data
Gene ontology
Molecular function	G protein-coupled receptor activity; olfactory receptor activity; signal transducer activity
Cellular component	integral component of membrane; plasma membrane; membrane
Biological process	sensory perception of smell; signal transduction; response to stimulus; detection of chemical stimulus involved in sensory perception of smell; G protein-coupled receptor signaling pathway
Sources:Amigo / QuickGO
Orthologs
Databases	NCBI: entry; OMA: entry
Species	Human	Mouse
Entrez	8590	18317
Ensembl	ENSG00000184933	ENSMUSG00000070417
UniProt	O95222	n/a
RefSeq (mRNA)	NM_003696	NM_010983
RefSeq (protein)	NP_003687	n/a
Location (UCSC)	Chr 11: 6.79 – 6.8 Mb	Chr 7: 106.59 – 106.61 Mb
PubMed search
- Wikidata
View/Edit Human	View/Edit Mouse

Olfactory receptor 6A2 is a protein that in humans is encoded by the OR6A2 gene. It is Class II (tetrapod-specific) olfactory receptor and a rhodopsin-like receptor.

== Function ==
Olfactory receptors interact with odorant molecules in the nose, to initiate a neuronal response that triggers the perception of a smell. The olfactory receptor proteins are members of a large family of G-protein-coupled receptors (GPCR) arising from single coding-exon genes. Olfactory receptors share a 7-transmembrane domain structure with many neurotransmitters and hormone receptors and are responsible for the recognition and G protein-mediated transduction of odorant signals.

== Clinical significance ==
Variation in the OR6A2 gene has been identified as a likely cause of why some people enjoy the smell and taste of coriander leaf (also known as cilantro) while others are extremely repulsed by it. Depending on ancestry, between 3% and 21% of the Canadian population report disliking coriander: 21% for East Asians, 17% for Europeans, 14% for those of African descent, 7% for South Asians, 4% for Hispanics, and 3% for Middle Eastern subjects. However, these figures do not represent the prevalence of the OR6A2 gene.

Some associate it with an intensely unpleasant taste, including a combination of soap and vomit, or say that it is similar to the foul smelling odor emitted by stinkbugs. This is suggested to be due to the presence of certain aldehydes, such as decanal, (E)-2-decenal and (E)-2-dodecenal. These substances may be present in soap and various detergents as well as coriander, and also form part of the secretions of several species of stinkbugs, including Halyomorpha halys.

== See also ==
- Olfactory receptor
