= Pinane =

Identifiers
CAS Number	473-55-2 cis and trans; trans: 6876-13-7; cis: 4755-33-3
3D model (JSmol)	Interactive image; trans: Interactive image; cis: Interactive image
Beilstein Reference	1847301
ChEBI	CHEBI:35710
ChEMBL	ChEMBL1422299
ChemSpider	9724
ECHA InfoCard	100.006.790
EC Number	207-467-1; trans: 229-978-9
PubChem CID	10129; trans: 6429433; cis: 10969850
UNII	trans: 6603788013; cis: N7C9IBU49F
UN number	3295
CompTox Dashboard (EPA)	DTXSID7025922
- InChI: InChI=1S/C10H18/c1-7-4-5-8-6-9(7)10(8,2)3/h7-9H,4-6H2,1-3H3 Key: XOKSLPVRUOBDEW-UHFFFAOYSA-N; trans: InChI=1S/C10H18/c1-7-4-5-8-6-9(7)10(8,2)3/h7-9H,4-6H2,1-3H3/t7-,8-,9-/m0/s1 Key: XOKSLPVRUOBDEW-CIUDSAMLSA-N; cis: InChI=1S/C10H18/c1-7-4-5-8-6-9(7)10(8,2)3/h7-9H,4-6H2,1-3H3/t7-,8+,9+/m1/s1 Key: XOKSLPVRUOBDEW-VGMNWLOBSA-N
- SMILES: CC1CCC2CC1C2(C)C; trans: C[C@H]1CC[C@H]2C[C@@H]1C2(C)C; cis: C[C@@H]1CC[C@H]2C[C@@H]1C2(C)C

Properties
Chemical formula	C_{10}H_{18}
Molar mass	138.254 g·mol^{−1}
Appearance	colorless liquids
Boiling point	167.2 – 168 °C (cis); 164 °C (trans)
- Except where otherwise noted, data are given for materials in their standard state (at 25 °C [77 °F], 100 kPa). Infobox references

Pinane describes a pair of isomeric hydrocarbons. The isomers, actually diastereomers, are both chiral. They are the cis and trans isomers arising from the hydrogenation of the terpenes pinene. Both isomers undergo reaction with air (autoxidation) to give 2-pinane hydroperoxides. Partial reduction of these isomers gives 2-pinanol. Pyrolysis of pinane gives dimethyloctadienes, which can be further transformed into the fragrance chemical dihydromyrcenol.

Formation of dimethyloctadienes
