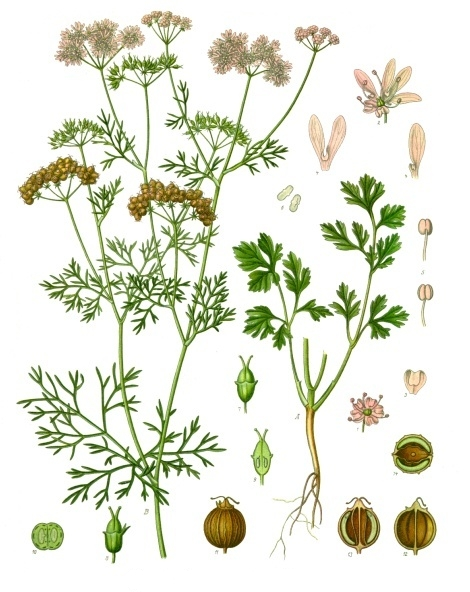
- Illustration of coriander parts

Scientific classification
- Kingdom: Plantae
- Clade: Tracheophytes
- Clade: Angiosperms
- Clade: Eudicots
- Clade: Asterids
- Order: Apiales
- Family: Apiaceae
- Genus: Coriandrum
- Species: C. sativum

Binomial name
- Coriandrum sativum L.

= Coriander =

Annual herb

Coriander (/ˌkɒriˈændər, ˈkɒriændər/), or Coriandrum sativum, is an annual herb in the family Apiaceae. The leaves are known as cilantro (/sɪˈlæntroʊ, -ˈlɑːn-/) in the US. Most people perceive the leaves as having a fresh, slightly citrus taste. Due to variations in the gene OR6A2, some people perceive its flavor to be more soaplike or rotten.

The species is native to the Mediterranean Basin. All parts of the plant are edible, with the fresh leaves and dried seeds most traditionally used in cooking. It is included in Peruvian, Mexican, Arab, Indian and Southeast Asian cuisines.

== Description ==
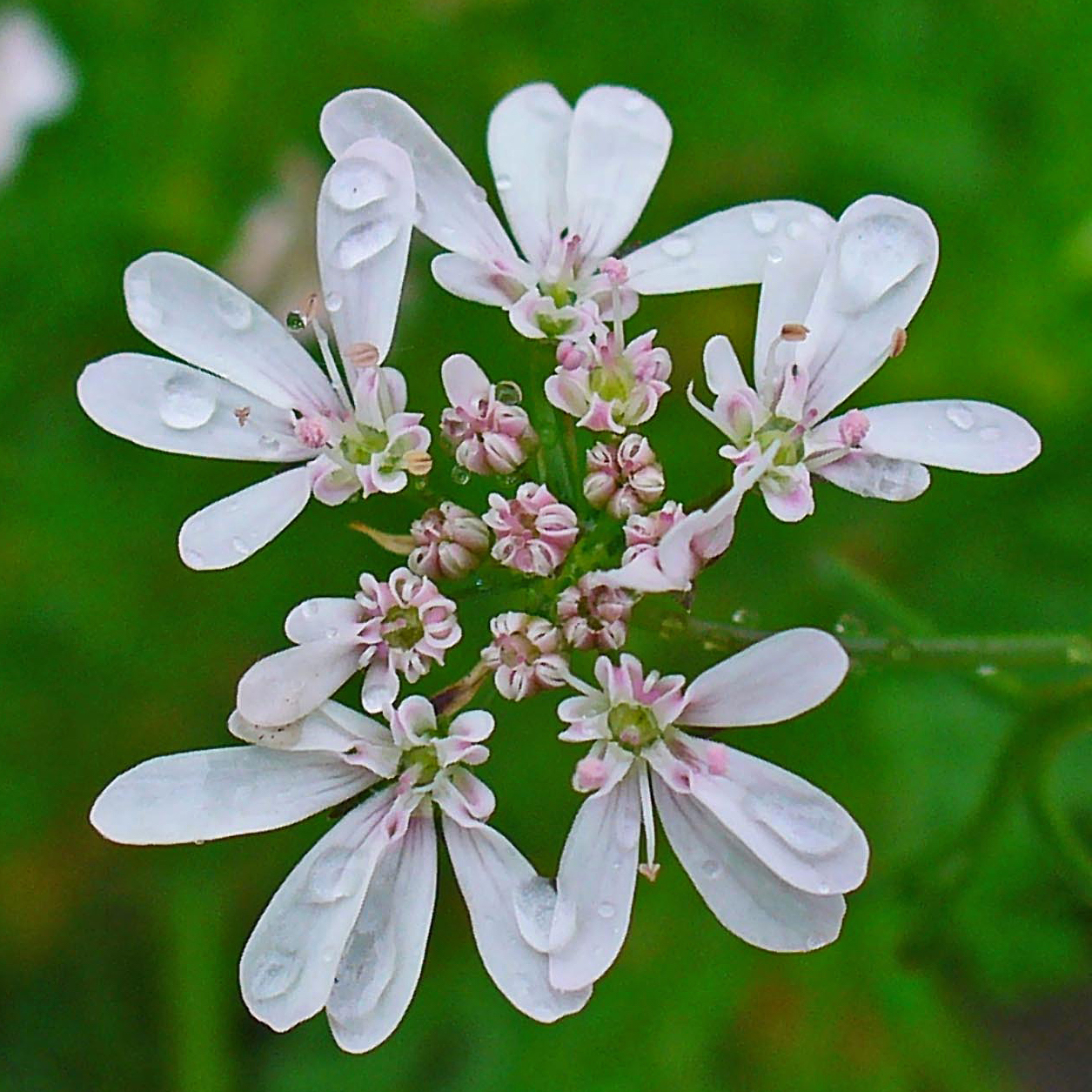
Coriandrum sativum flowers

It is a soft plant growing to 50 cm (20 in) tall. The leaves are variable in shape, broadly lobed at the base of the plant, and slender and feathery higher on the flowering stems.

The flowers are borne in small umbels, white or very pale pink, asymmetrical, with the petals pointing away from the centre of the umbel longer (5–6 mm or 3/16–1/4 in) than those pointing toward it (only 1–3 mm or 1/16–1/8 in long). The fruit is a globular, dry schizocarp 3–5 mm (1/8–3/16 in) in diameter. The pollen size is approximately 30 μm (0.0012 in).

=== Taste and smell ===
Linalool, a terpenoid, is a major contributor to the fragrance of coriander.

The essential oil from coriander leaves and seeds contains mixed polyphenols and terpenes, including linalool as the major constituent accounting for the aroma and flavour of coriander.

Different people may perceive the taste of coriander leaves differently. Those who enjoy it say it has a refreshing, lemony or lime-like flavour, while those who dislike it have a strong aversion to its pungent taste and smell, characterizing it as soapy or rotten. Studies also show variations in preference among different ethnic groups: 21% of East Asians, 17% of Europeans, and 14% of people of African descent expressed a dislike for coriander, but among the groups where coriander is popular in their cuisine, only 7% of South Asians, 4% of Hispanics, and 3% of Middle Eastern subjects expressed a dislike.

About 80% of identical twins shared the same preference for the herb, but fraternal twins agreed only about half the time, strongly suggesting a genetic component to the preference. In a genetic survey of nearly 30,000 people, two genetic variants linked to the perception of coriander have been found, the more common of which is a gene involved in sensing smells. The gene OR6A2 lies within a cluster of olfactory-receptor genes, and encodes a receptor that is highly sensitive to aldehyde chemicals. Flavour chemists have found that the coriander aroma is created by a half-dozen substances, most of which are aldehydes. Those who dislike the taste are sensitive to the offending unsaturated aldehydes and, at the same time, may be unable to detect the aromatic chemicals that others find pleasant. Association between its taste and several other genes, including a bitter-taste receptor, have also been found.

=== Similar plants ===
- Eryngium foetidum, also a member of the Apiaceae, has a similar but more intense taste. Known as culantro and ngò gai, it is found in Mexico, the Caribbean, Central and South America, and South East Asia cuisine.
- Persicaria odorata is commonly called Vietnamese coriander, or rau răm. The leaves have a similar odour and flavour to coriander. It is a member of the Polygonaceae, or buckwheat family.
- "Summer cilantro" is one common name for Porophyllum ruderale subsp. macrocephalum, a member of the Asteraceae, the sunflower family. This species is found growing wild from Texas to Argentina.

== Etymology ==
First attested in English during the late 14th century, the word "coriander" derives from the Old French coriandre, which comes from Latin coriandrum, in turn from Ancient Greek κορίανδρον : koríandron (also κορίαννον : koríannon), possibly derived from or related to κόρις : kóris (a bed bug), and was given on account of its fetid, bug-like smell.

The earliest attested form of the word is the Mycenaean Greek ko-ri-ja-da-na (variants: ko-ri-a_{2}-da-na, ko-ri-ja-do-no, ko-ri-jo-da-na) written in Linear B syllabic script (reconstructed as koriadnon, similar to the name of Minos' daughter Ariadne) which later evolved to koriannon or koriandron.

Cilantro is the Spanish word for coriander, also deriving from coriandrum. It is the common term in US English for coriander leaves due to their extensive use in Mexican cuisine, but the seeds are referred to as coriander in American English.

== Origin and distribution ==
Coriander is native to the Mediterranean Basin. It grows wild over a wide area of West Asia and Southern Europe, making it difficult to define where the plant is native and where it was only recently established. Some research on wild coriander indicates that the southwestern Levant and Portugal may be locations for its origin. Seeds have low germination rates, a small vegetative appearance, and a hard seed coat.

In Palestine, fifteen desiccated mericarps were found in the Pre-Pottery Neolithic B level (six to eight thousand years ago) of the Nahal Hemar Cave, and eleven from about 8,000–7,500 years ago in Pre-Pottery Neolithic C in Atlit-Yam. If these finds do belong to these archaeological layers, they are the oldest find of coriander in the world. The herb is mentioned in the Torah as a point of reference for the taste of manna, implying it was a well-known ingredient in ancient Israel.

About 500 millilitres (17 US fl oz) of coriander mericarps were recovered from the tomb of Tutankhamen. As coriander does not grow wild in Egypt, this could be proof that coriander was cultivated by the ancient Egyptians. The Ebers Papyrus, an Egyptian text dated around 1550 BCE, mentioned uses of coriander.

Coriander may have been cultivated in Greece since at least the second millennium BCE. One of the Linear B tablets recovered from Pylos refers to the species as being cultivated for the manufacture of perfumes. It was used in two forms: as a spice for its seeds and as an herb for the flavour of its leaves. This appears to be confirmed by archaeological evidence: the large quantities of coriander retrieved from an Early Bronze Age layer at Sitagroi in Macedonia could point to cultivation of the herb at that time.

== Allergies ==
Some people are allergic to coriander leaves or seeds, having symptoms similar to those of other food allergies. A cross-sectional study of 589 cases where food allergies to spices were suspected found 32% of pin-prick tests in children and 23% in adults were positive for coriander and other members of the family Apiaceae, including caraway, fennel, and celery. The allergic symptoms may be minor or life-threatening.

== Uses ==
=== Nutrition ===
Coriander (cilantro) leaves, raw
Nutritional value per 100 g (3.5 oz)
- Energy: 95 kJ (23 kcal)
- Carbohydrates: 3.67 g
- Sugars: 0.87
- Dietary fiber: 2.8 g
- Fat: 0.52 g
- Protein: 2.13 g
Vitamins and minerals
Vitamins	Quantity %DV^{†}
Vitamin A equiv. beta-Carotene lutein zeaxanthin	37% 337 μg 36% 3930 μg 865 μg
Thiamine (B1)	6% 0.067 mg
Riboflavin (B2)	12% 0.162 mg
Niacin (B3)	7% 1.114 mg
Pantothenic acid (B5)	11% 0.57 mg
Vitamin B6	9% 0.149 mg
Folate (B9)	16% 62 μg
Vitamin C	30% 27 mg
Vitamin E	17% 2.5 mg
Vitamin K	258% 310 μg
Minerals	Quantity %DV^{†}
Calcium	5% 67 mg
Iron	10% 1.77 mg
Magnesium	6% 26 mg
Manganese	19% 0.426 mg
Phosphorus	4% 48 mg
Potassium	17% 521 mg
Sodium	2% 46 mg
Zinc	5% 0.5 mg
- Other constituents: Quantity
- Water: 92.21 g
- Link to USDA Database entry
- ^{†}Percentages estimated using US recommendations for adults, except for potassium, which is estimated based on expert recommendation from the National Academies.

Raw coriander leaves are 92% water, 4% carbohydrates, 2% protein, and less than 1% fat. The nutritional profile of coriander seeds is different from that of fresh stems or leaves. The leaves are particularly rich in vitamin A, C, and K, with moderate content of dietary minerals. Although seeds generally have lower vitamin content, they do provide significant amounts of dietary fiber, calcium, selenium, iron, magnesium, and manganese.

=== Culinary ===
All parts of the plant are edible. The fresh leaves and dried seeds are the most commonly used in cooking. Coriander is used in cuisines throughout the world.

==== Leaves ====
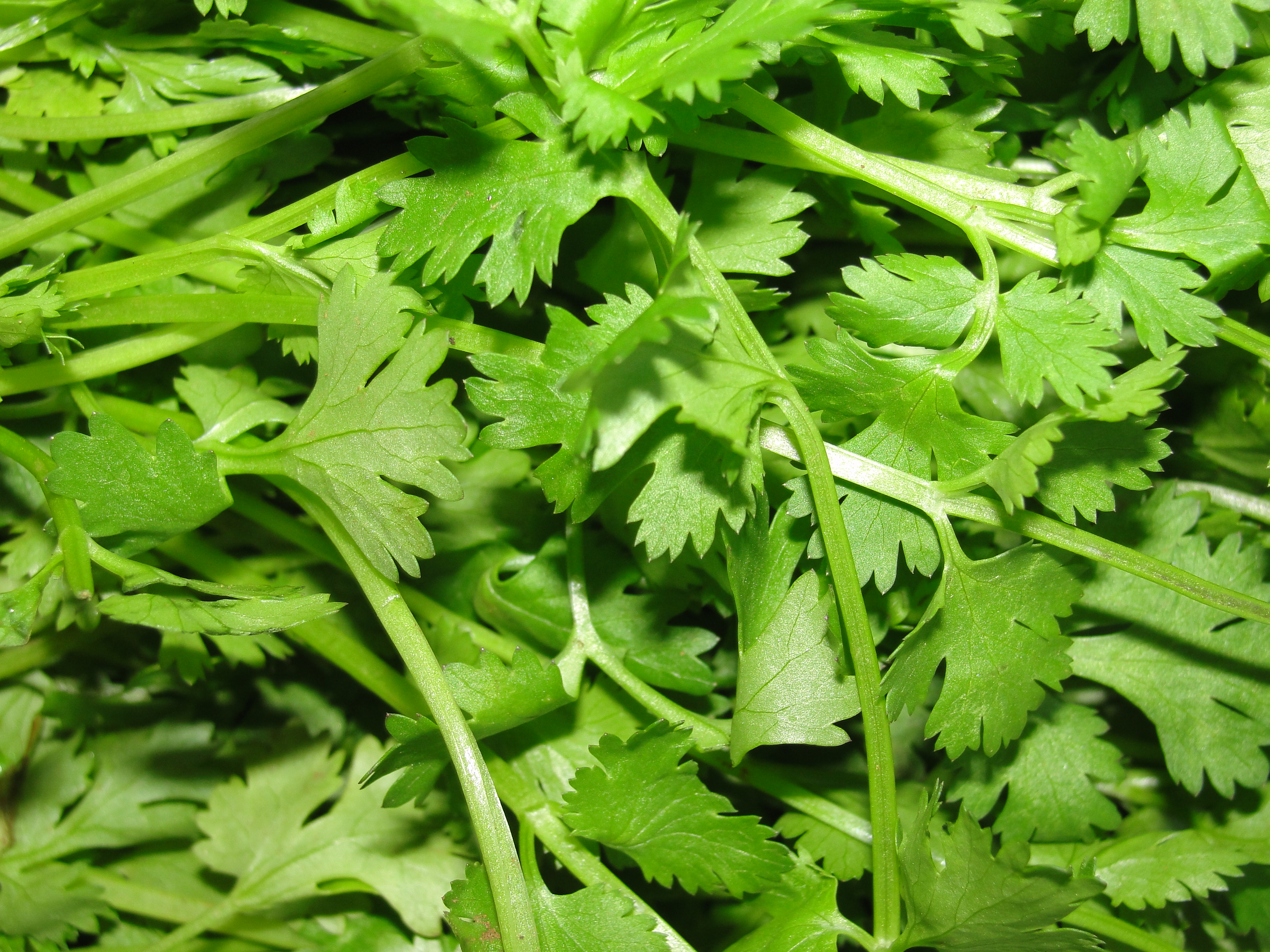
Coriander leaves

The leaves are variously referred to as coriander leaves, fresh coriander, Chinese parsley, or cilantro (US, commercially in Canada, and Spanish-speaking countries). The fresh leaves are an ingredient in many foods, such as chutneys and salads, salsa, guacamole, and as a widely used garnish for soup, fish, and meat. As heat diminishes their flavour, coriander leaves are often used raw or added to the dish immediately before serving. In Indian and Central Asian recipes, coriander or dhania leaves are used in large amounts and cooked until the flavour diminishes. The leaves spoil quickly when removed from the plant and lose their aroma when dried or frozen.

The taste of the leaves differs from that of the seeds. The seeds exhibit citrus overtones. The dominant flavorants in the leaves are the aldehydes 2-decenal and 2-dodecenal. The main flavorant in the seeds is (+)-linalool.

==== Seeds ====
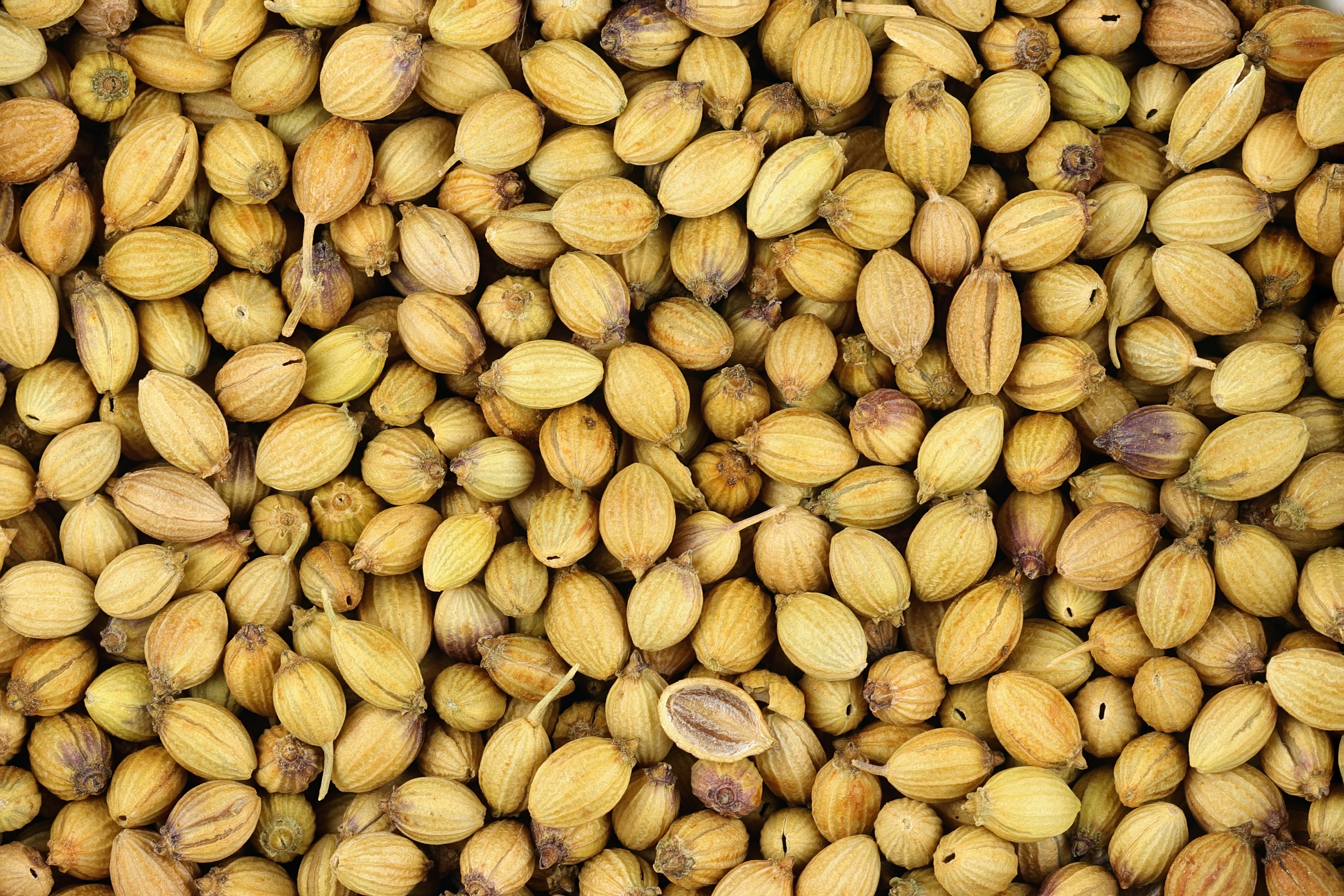
Dried coriander fruits are often called "coriander seeds" when used as a spice.

The dry fruits are coriander seeds. The word "coriander" in food preparation may refer solely to these seeds (as a spice), rather than the plant. The seeds have a lemony citrus flavor when crushed due to the terpenes linalool (which comprises about two thirds of its volatile components) and pinene. It is described as warm, nutty, spicy, and orange-flavoured.

The variety C. sativum var. sativum has a fruit diameter of 3–5 mm (1/8–3/16 in), while var. microcarpum fruits have a diameter of 1.5–3 mm (0.06–0.12 in), and var. indicum has elongated fruits. Large-fruited types are grown mainly by tropical and subtropical countries, such as Morocco, India, and Australia, and contain a low volatile oil content (0.1–0.4%). They are used for grinding and blending purposes in the spice trade. Types with smaller fruit are produced in temperate regions and usually have a volatile oil content of around 0.4–1.8%, so they are highly valued as a raw material for the preparation of essential oil.

Coriander is commonly found both as whole dried seeds and in ground form. Roasting or heating the seeds in a dry pan heightens the flavor, aroma, and pungency. Ground coriander seed loses flavor quickly in storage and is best ground fresh. Coriander seed is a spice in garam masala, and Indian curries, which often employ the ground fruits in generous amounts together with cumin, acting as a thickener in a mixture called dhania jeera. Roasted coriander seeds, called dhania dal, are eaten as a snack.

Outside of Asia, coriander seed is used widely for pickling vegetables. In Germany and South Africa (see boerewors), the seeds are used while making sausages. In Russia and Central Europe, coriander seed is an occasional ingredient in rye bread (such as Borodinsky bread) as an alternative to caraway. The Zuni people of North America have adopted it into their cuisine, mixing the powdered seeds ground with chili peppers, using it as a condiment with meat, and eating leaves as a salad.

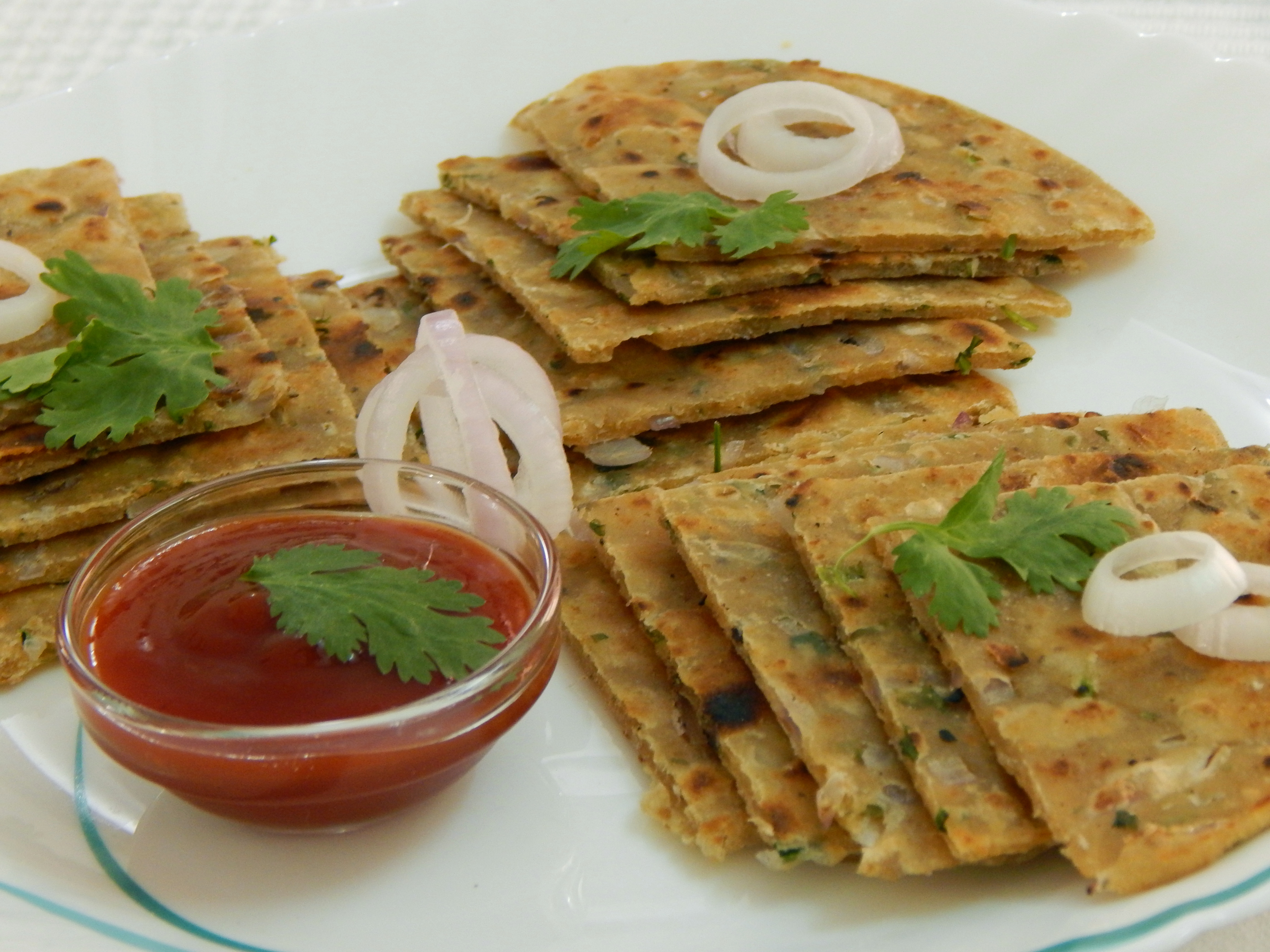
Onion coriander paratha

Coriander seeds are used in brewing certain styles of beer, particularly some Belgian wheat beers. The coriander seeds are used with orange peel to add a citrus character.

Coriander seeds are one of the key botanicals used to flavor gin.

One preliminary study showed coriander essential oil to inhibit Gram-positive and Gram-negative bacteria, including Staphylococcus aureus, Enterococcus faecalis, Pseudomonas aeruginosa, and Escherichia coli.

Coriander is listed as one of the original ingredients in the secret formula for Coca-Cola.

==== Roots ====
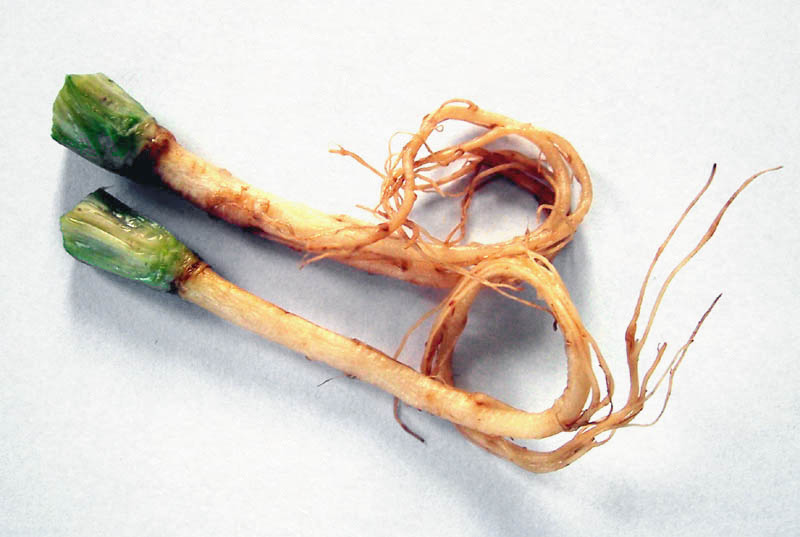
Coriander roots

Coriander roots have a deeper, more intense flavour than the leaves and are used in a variety of Asian cuisines, particularly in Thai dishes such as soups or curry pastes.

== In culture ==
Coriander was mentioned by Hippocrates (around 400 BCE), as well as Dioscorides (65 CE).
