= Orotidine =

- Chemical structure of orotidine

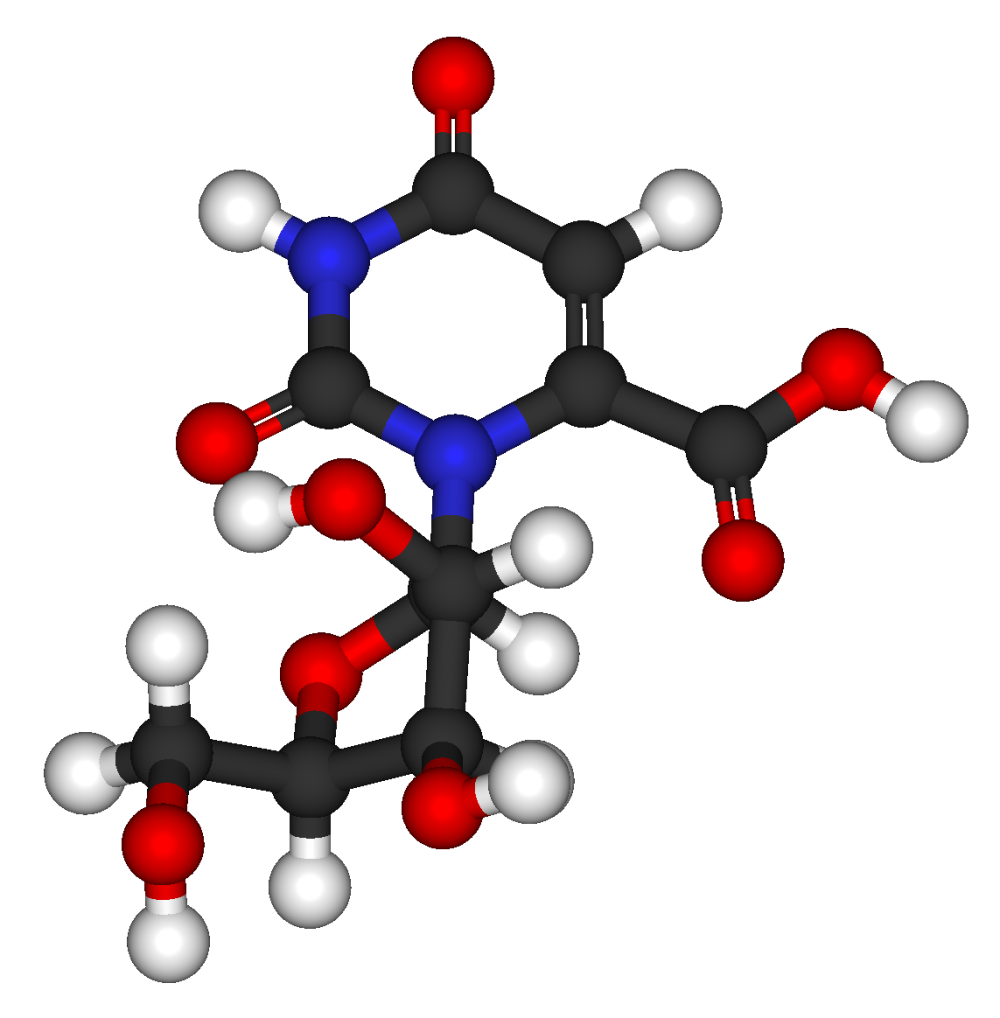
- Ball-and-stick model of orotidine

Names
- IUPAC name 2,6-Dioxo-3-(β-D-ribofuranosyl)-1,2,3,6-tetrahydropyrimidine-4-carboxylic acid
- Systematic IUPAC name 3-[(2R,3R,4S,5R)-3,4-Dihydroxy-6-(hydroxymethyl)oxolan-2-yl]-2,6-dioxo-1,2,3,6-tetrahydropyrimidine-4-carboxylic acid
- Other names 3-Ribofuranosylorotic acid, 6-Carboxyuridine, orotate riboside

Identifiers
CAS Number	314-50-1
3D model (JSmol)	Interactive image
ChemSpider	83729
PubChem CID	92751
UNII	B350MC02GZ
CompTox Dashboard (EPA)	DTXSID90953435
- InChI: InChI=1S/C10H12N2O8/c13-2-4-6(15)7(16)8(20-4)12-3(9(17)18)1-5(14)11-10(12)19/h1,4,6-8,13,15-16H,2H2,(H,17,18)(H,11,14,19)/t4-,6-,7-,8-/m1/s1 Key: FKCRAVPPBFWEJD-XVFCMESISA-N
- SMILES: O=C(O)C=1N(C(=O)NC(=O)C=1)[C@@H]2O[C@@H]([C@@H](O)[C@H]2O)CO

Properties
Chemical formula	C_{10}H_{12}N_{2}O_{8}
Molar mass	288.213 g/mol
Melting point	200 °C (392 °F; 473 K)
- Except where otherwise noted, data are given for materials in their standard state (at 25 °C [77 °F], 100 kPa). verify (what is ?) Infobox references

Orotidine is a nucleoside formed by attaching orotic acid to a ribose ring via a β-N_{1}-glycosidic bond. It is found in bacteria, fungi and plants. It was first isolated in 1951 from the fungus Neurospora by A. Michael Michelson, William Drell, and Herschel K. Mitchell. In humans, orotidine occurs as its 5'-phosphate (orotidylic acid), which is an intermediate in pyrimidine nucleotide biosynthesis (cytidine and uridine) that are found in nucleic acids. Orotidine itself is not a component of nucleic acid. Large amounts of orotidine are excreted in the urine of cancer patients treated with 6-azauridine.

The symbol commonly used for orotidine is O or Ord.
