= Hydroxyephedrine =

Hydroxyephedrine may refer to:

- 3-Hydroxyephedrine (meta-hydroxyephedrine)
- 4-Hydroxyephedrine (oxilofrine)
