= Myrtenol =

Names
- IUPAC name (6,6-dimethylbicyclo[3.1.1]hept-2-en-2-yl)methanol
- Other names: (±)-Myrtenol; 2-Pinen-10-ol; Pin-2-ene-10-ol; 10-Hydroxy-2-pinene

Identifiers
CAS Number	515-00-4
3D model (JSmol)	Interactive image
ChEMBL	ChEMBL443408
ChemSpider	10137
ECHA InfoCard	100.007.449
EC Number	208-193-5
KEGG	C11938
PubChem CID	10582
CompTox Dashboard (EPA)	DTXSID00862089
- InChI: InChI=1S/C10H16O/c1-10(2)8-4-3-7(6-11)9(10)5-8/h3,8-9,11H,4-6H2,1-2H3 Key: RXBQNMWIQKOSCS-UHFFFAOYSA-N
- SMILES: CC1(C2CC=C(C1C2)CO)C

Properties
Chemical formula	C_{10}H_{16}O
Molar mass	152.237 g·mol^{−1}
Boiling point	221.5 °C (430.7 °F; 494.6 K)
- Except where otherwise noted, data are given for materials in their standard state (at 25 °C [77 °F], 100 kPa). Infobox references

Myrtenol is a chemical compound isolated from plants in the genus Taxus.

== See also ==
- Borneol
- Fenchol
- Juniperol
- Myrtenal
