= 2-Decenal =

Names
- Preferred IUPAC name Dec-2-enal
- Other names Dec-2-en-1-al; 2-Decenaldehyde; Dec-2-enaldehyde; 3-Heptylacrolein

Identifiers
CAS Number	3913-71-1
3D model (JSmol)	Interactive image
ChEBI	CHEBI:134220; (E): CHEBI:133455
ChEMBL	(E): ChEMBL507518
ChemSpider	18652
ECHA InfoCard	100.021.339
EC Number	223-472-1; (E): 223-474-2
PubChem CID	5283345
UNII	E93S23U2BU
CompTox Dashboard (EPA)	DTXSID8052065
- InChI: InChI=1S/C10H18O/c1-2-3-4-5-6-7-8-9-10-11/h8-10H,2-7H2,1H3/b9-8+ Key: MMFCJPPRCYDLLZ-CMDGGOBGSA-N
- SMILES: CCCCCCC/C=C/C=O

Properties
Chemical formula	C_{10}H_{18}O
Molar mass	154.253 g·mol^{−1}
Appearance	Clear to yellow, oily liquid
Density	0.841 g/mL
Melting point	−16 °C (3 °F; 257 K)
Boiling point	79 °C (174 °F; 352 K)

Hazards
- GHS labelling
Pictograms	(GHS07: Exclamation mark)
Signal word	Warning
Hazard statements	H315, H319
Precautionary statements	P264, P280, P302+P352, P305+P351+P338, P321, P332+P313, P337+P313, P362
NFPA 704 (fire diamond)	2 1 0
- Except where otherwise noted, data are given for materials in their standard state (at 25 °C [77 °F], 100 kPa). Infobox references

2-Decenal (dec-2-enal) is an organic compound with the chemical formula of C_{10}H_{18}O. It exists as a pair of cis and trans isomers, (2E)-2-decenal and (2Z)-2-decenal. It is an oily, clear liquid under normal conditions, that may be yellow due to impurities. 2-Decenal is described as having a strong, waxy odor. It is found in animal food (in trace quantities), and is part of the essential oil of coriander. 2-Decenal is also used as a flavoring agent.

== Occurrence ==
2-Decenal is found in a wide variety of foods. It has been reported in bitter orange peel, blackberry, ginger, butter, mushroom, kiwi, bacon fat, roast beef, beef fat, heated beef fat, bilberries, carrot root, boiled chicken, chicken broth, cranberry press residue, ham, lingonberry, orange, heated pork fat, potato chip, soy bean, boiled mutton, tea, roasted hazelnuts, french fries, tomato, wheat bread, roasted pecans, rice, roasted peanuts, and coriander leaf. Alongside (E)-2-dodecenal, the presence of this aldehyde in coriander leaf has been linked to a commonly reported distaste for the herb among people with a certain variant of the OR6A2 gene.

2-Decenal is also found as an additive in cigarettes, and is a major component of the malodorous defensive secretions emitted from the brown marmorated stink bug (Halyomorpha halys).

== Applications ==
2-Decenal can be used as a nematicide (a pesticide used to kill plant-parasitic nematodes). It is a mutagen, but it also has a biological role as a pheromone, which is released by an organism when damaged by a predator which warns other individuals that there is a danger.

== Synthesis ==
2-Decenal can be synthesized by reacting octanal with ethyl vinyl ether, and subsequently hydrolyzing the mixture.
