= Decanal =

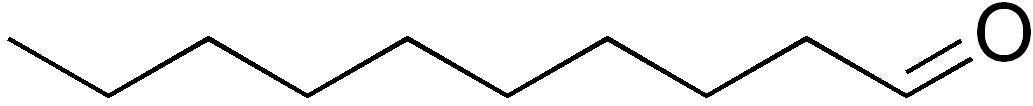

Names
- Preferred IUPAC name Decanal
- Other names Decyl aldehyde, caprinaldehyde

Identifiers
CAS Number	112-31-2
3D model (JSmol)	Interactive image
ChEBI	CHEBI:31457
ChEMBL	ChEMBL2228377
ChemSpider	7883
ECHA InfoCard	100.003.598
EC Number	203-957-4
KEGG	C12307
PubChem CID	8175
UNII	31Z90Q7KQJ
CompTox Dashboard (EPA)	DTXSID4021553
- InChI: InChI=1S/C10H20O/c1-2-3-4-5-6-7-8-9-10-11/h10H,2-9H2,1H3 Key: KSMVZQYAVGTKIV-UHFFFAOYSA-N; InChI=1/C10H20O/c1-2-3-4-5-6-7-8-9-10-11/h10H,2-9H2,1H3 Key: KSMVZQYAVGTKIV-UHFFFAOYAQ
- SMILES: O=CCCCCCCCCC

Properties
Chemical formula	C_{10}H_{20}O
Molar mass	156.269 g·mol^{−1}
Appearance	Colorless liquid
Density	0.83 g/mL
Melting point	7 °C (45 °F; 280 K)
Boiling point	207 to 209 °C (405 to 408 °F; 480 to 482 K)

Hazards
- GHS labelling
Pictograms	(GHS07: Exclamation mark)
Signal word	Warning
Hazard statements	H315, H319, H412
Precautionary statements	P264, P273, P280, P302+P352, P305+P351+P338, P321, P332+P313, P337+P313, P362, P501
NFPA 704 (fire diamond)	2 2 0
Flash point	85 °C (185 °F; 358 K)
Autoignition temperature	200 °C (392 °F; 473 K)
- Lethal dose or concentration (LD, LC)
LD_{50} (median dose)	3730 mg/kg (rat, oral); 5040 mg/kg (rabbit, dermal)
Safety data sheet (SDS)	Fisher Scientific

Related compounds
Related compounds	2-Decanone
- Except where otherwise noted, data are given for materials in their standard state (at 25 °C [77 °F], 100 kPa). verify (what is ?) Infobox references

Decanal is an organic compound with the chemical formula CH_{3}(CH_{2})_{8}CHO. A colorless oil, it is classified as an aldehyde.

== Occurrence ==
Decanal occurs naturally in citrus, along with octanal, citral, and sinensal, in buckwheat, and in coriander essential oil. It is used in fragrances and flavoring.

== Preparation ==
Decanal can be prepared by oxidation of the related alcohol decanol.

== Safety ==
For safety information see the MSDS.
