= Tolylfluanid =

Names
- Preferred IUPAC name N-{[Dichloro(fluoro)methyl]sulfanyl}-N′,N′-dimethyl-N-(4-methylphenyl)sulfuric diamide

Identifiers
CAS Number	731-27-1
3D model (JSmol)	Interactive image
ChEBI	CHEBI:75182
ChEMBL	ChEMBL3189057
ChemSpider	12364
ECHA InfoCard	100.010.898
EC Number	211-986-9
KEGG	C18899
PubChem CID	12898
UNII	382277YXSG
CompTox Dashboard (EPA)	DTXSID8042478
- InChI: InChI=1S/C10H13Cl2FN2O2S2/c1-8-4-6-9(7-5-8)15(18-10(11,12)13)19(16,17)14(2)3/h4-7H,1-3H3 Key: HYVWIQDYBVKITD-UHFFFAOYSA-N
- SMILES: CC1=CC=C(C=C1)N(SC(F)(Cl)Cl)S(=O)(=O)N(C)C

Properties
Chemical formula	C_{10}H_{13}Cl_{2}FN_{2}O_{2}S_{2}
Molar mass	347.244 g/mol
Appearance	colourless, odourless crystals
Density	1.52 g/cm^{3}
Melting point	93°C
Boiling point	Decomposes on distillation
Solubility in water	water, 0.9 mg/L at 20°C. Miscible in all proportions with acetone, ethanol, ethyl acetate, methylene chloride
Vapor pressure	<1.3 mPa (20°C)

Related compounds
Related compounds	Dichlofluanid

Hazards
- GHS labelling
Pictograms	(GHS06: Toxic) (GHS08: Health hazard) (GHS09: Environmental hazard)
Signal word	Danger
Hazard statements	H315, H317, H319, H330, H335, H372, H400
Precautionary statements	P260, P264, P264+P265, P270, P271, P272, P273, P280, P284, P302+P352, P304+P340, P305+P351+P338, P316, P319, P320, P321, P333+P317, P337+P317, P362+P364, P391, P403+P233, P405, P501
- Lethal dose or concentration (LD, LC)
LD_{50} (median dose)	1000 mg/kg (oral); 5000 mg/kg (skin absorption)
LC_{50} (median concentration)	0.02-0.3 mg/L
- Except where otherwise noted, data are given for materials in their standard state (at 25 °C [77 °F], 100 kPa). Infobox references

Tolylfluanid is an organic chemical compound that is used as an active ingredient in fungicides and wood preservatives.

== Synthesis ==
The synthesis of tolylfluanid begins with the reaction of dimethylamine and sulfuryl chloride. The product further reacts with p-toluidine and dichlorofluoromethanesulfenyl chloride to yield the final product.

== Use ==
Tolylfluanid is used on fruit and ornamental plants against gray mold (Botrytis), against late blight on tomatoes and against powdery mildew on cucumbers.

== Environmental behavior ==
Tolylfluanid hydrolyzes slowly in acidic conditions. The half-life is shorter when the pH is high; at pH = 7, it is at least 2 days. In aerobic media (pH = 7.7-8.0), tolylfluanid hydrolytically and microbially decomposes to N,N-dimethyl-N-(4-methylphenyl) sulfamide (DMST) and dimethylsulfamide. After 14 days, tolylfluanid is generally considered to have degraded. The half-life of DMST is 50-70 days.

== Absorption, metabolism and excretion ==
Tolylfluanid is rapidly and almost completely absorbed in the gastrointestinal tract. The highest concentrations are found in the blood, lungs, liver, kidneys, spleen and thyroid gland. 99% is excreted in the urine within two days, although there is some accumulation in the thyroid gland.
