= Methallatal =

Clinical data
- Trade names: Mosidal

Identifiers
- IUPAC name: 5-ethyl-5-(2-methylprop-2-enyl)-2-sulfanylidene-1,3-diazinane-4,6-dione
- CAS Number: 115-56-0
- PubChem CID: 3032288
- ChemSpider: 2297301
- UNII: N60S305Q6P
- ChEBI: CHEBI:134930
- ChEMBL: ChEMBL2132121
- CompTox Dashboard (EPA): DTXSID70150920
- ECHA InfoCard: 100.003.723

Chemical and physical data
- Formula: C_{10}H_{14}N_{2}O_{2}S
- Molar mass: 226.29 g·mol^{−1}
- 3D model (JSmol): Interactive image
- SMILES: CCC1(C(=O)NC(=S)NC1=O)CC(=C)C
- InChI: InChI=1S/C10H14N2O2S/c1-4-10(5-6(2)3)7(13)11-9(15)12-8(10)14/h2,4-5H2,1,3H3,(H2,11,12,13,14,15); Key:XMQICEWOKPEQRG-UHFFFAOYSA-N

Methallatal is a barbiturate derivative first synthesized in the 1940s (designation V-12). It has sedative and hypnotic properties.

Methallatal was formerly marketed under the trade name Mosidal from 1940s to 1950s for veterinary use, specifically for preventing motion sickness in dogs.
