= Paramenthane hydroperoxide =

Names
- IUPAC name 2-hydroperoxy-4-methyl-1-propan-2-ylcyclohexane
- Other names Menthyl hydroperoxide

Identifiers
CAS Number	39811-34-2
3D model (JSmol)	Interactive image
ChemSpider	104850
ECHA InfoCard	100.043.610
EC Number	247-987-6
PubChem CID	117329
UNII	KB7U8VZ57A
CompTox Dashboard (EPA)	DTXSID40865317 DTXSID10894391, DTXSID40865317
- InChI: InChI=1S/C10H20O2/c1-7(2)9-5-4-8(3)6-10(9)12-11/h7-11H,4-6H2,1-3H3 Key: OZTWDFWAMMUDHQ-UHFFFAOYSA-N
- SMILES: CC1CCC(C(C1)OO)C(C)C

Properties
Chemical formula	C_{10}H_{20}O_{2}
Molar mass	172.268 g·mol^{−1}
Appearance	Light yellow liquid (50% solution)
Odor	Distinct

Hazards
- Occupational safety and health (OHS/OSH)
Main hazards	Oxidizing, flammable, causes severe burns, explosive decomposition possible above 60°C
- GHS labelling
Pictograms	(GHS02: Flammable) (GHS05: Corrosive) (GHS08: Health hazard)
Signal word	Danger
Hazard statements	H242, H314, H373
Precautionary statements	P210, P220, P234, P260, P264, P280, P301+P330+P331, P303+P361+P353, P304+P340, P305+P351+P338, P310, P314, P321, P363, P370+P378, P403+P235, P405, P411, P420, P501
Safety data sheet (SDS)	MSDS
- Except where otherwise noted, data are given for materials in their standard state (at 25 °C [77 °F], 100 kPa). Infobox references

Paramenthane hydroperoxide (PMHP) is an organic peroxide with a distinctive odor. It is used on an industrial scale as a polymerization initiator for emulsion polymerizations. It is usually sold in a light yellow liquid solutions of about 50% strength.
