= Myrtenal =

Names
- IUPAC name 6,6-dimethylbicyclo[3.1.1]hept-2-ene-2-carbaldehyde
- Other names (1R)-2-Pinen-10-a; Benihinal

Identifiers
CAS Number	(±): 564–94–3
3D model (JSmol)	Interactive image; (±): Interactive image; {-]: Interactive image
ChemSpider	55078; (±): 1013321; {-]: 1013322
ECHA InfoCard	100.008.432
EC Number	209–274–8
MeSH	myrtenal
PubChem CID	61130
UNII	8J97443QRZ
CompTox Dashboard (EPA)	DTXSID60865112
- InChI: InChI=1S/C10H14O/c1-10(2)8-4-3-7(6–11)9(10)5-8/h3,6,8-9H,4-5H2,1-2H3 Key: KMRMUZKLFIEVAO-UHFFFAOYSA-N; (±): InChI=1S/C10H14O/c1-10(2)8-4-3-7(6–11)9(10)5-8/h3,6,8-9H,4-5H2,1-2H3/t8-,9-/m1/s1 Key: KMRMUZKLFIEVAO-RKDXNWHRSA-N; {-]: InChI=1S/C10H14O/c1-10(2)8-4-3-7(6–11)9(10)5-8/h3,6,8-9H,4-5H2,1-2H3/t8-,9-/m0/s1 Key: KMRMUZKLFIEVAO-IUCAKERBSA-N
- SMILES: CC1(C2CC=C(C1C2)C=O)C; (±): CC1([C@@H]2CC=C([C@H]1C2)C=O)C; {-]: CC1([C@H]2CC=C([C@@H]1C2)C=O)C

Properties
Chemical formula	C_{10}H_{14}O
Molar mass	150.221 g·mol^{−1}
Appearance	Colorless liquid
Density	0.987 g/cm^{3}
Boiling point	220-221 °C

Hazards
- GHS labelling
Pictograms	(GHS07: Exclamation mark)
Signal word	Warning
Hazard statements	H227
Precautionary statements	P210, P280, P370+P378, P403+P235, P501
Flash point	78 °C
- Except where otherwise noted, data are given for materials in their standard state (at 25 °C [77 °F], 100 kPa). Infobox references

Myrtenal is a bicyclic monoterpenoid with the chemical formula C_{10}H_{14}O. It is a naturally occurring molecule that can be found in numerous plant species including Hyssopus officinalis, Salvia absconditiflora, and Cyperus articulatus.

== Biological research ==
Myrtenal was shown to inhibit acetylcholinesterase, which is a common method of treatment of alzheimer's disease and dementia, in-vitro. In addition, mytenal has been shown to have antioxidant properties in rats.

== See also ==
- Myrtenol
