= Fenchol =

- (1R)-endo-(+)-Fenchol

Names
- IUPAC name (1R,2R,4S)-1,3,3-Trimethyl-2-norbornanol
- Other names Fenchyl alcohol

Identifiers
CAS Number	1632-73-1 (unspecified isomer); 2217-02-9 ((1R)-endo-(+))
3D model (JSmol)	Interactive image
ChEMBL	ChEMBL3188732
ChemSpider	14665
ECHA InfoCard	100.015.127
EC Number	216-639-5
PubChem CID	15406 (unspecified isomer); 6997371 ((1R)-endo-(+))
UNII	410Q2GK1HF
CompTox Dashboard (EPA)	DTXSID1041970
- InChI: InChI=1S/C10H18O/c1-9(2)7-4-5-10(3,6-7)8(9)11/h7-8,11H,4-6H2,1-3H3/t7-,8-,10+/m0/s1 Key: IAIHUHQCLTYTSF-OYNCUSHFSA-N
- SMILES: CC1(C2CCC(C2)(C1O)C)C

Properties
Chemical formula	C_{10}H_{18}O
Molar mass	154.253 g·mol^{−1}
Density	0.942 g/cm^{3}
Melting point	39 to 45 °C (102 to 113 °F; 312 to 318 K)
Boiling point	201 °C (394 °F; 474 K)
- Except where otherwise noted, data are given for materials in their standard state (at 25 °C [77 °F], 100 kPa). verify (what is ?) Infobox references

Fenchol or 1,3,3-trimethyl-2-norbornanol is a monoterpenoid and an isomer of borneol. It is a colorless or white solid. It occurs widely in nature.

The naturally occurring enantiomer (1R)-endo-(+)-fenchol is used extensively in perfumery. Fenchol gives basil its characteristic scent, and comprises 15.9% of the volatile oils of some species of Aster.

It is biosynthesized from geranyl pyrophosphate via isomerization to linalyl pyrophosphate.

Oxidation of fenchol gives fenchone.

== See also ==
- Juniperol
- Myrtenol
