= Sebacoyl chloride =

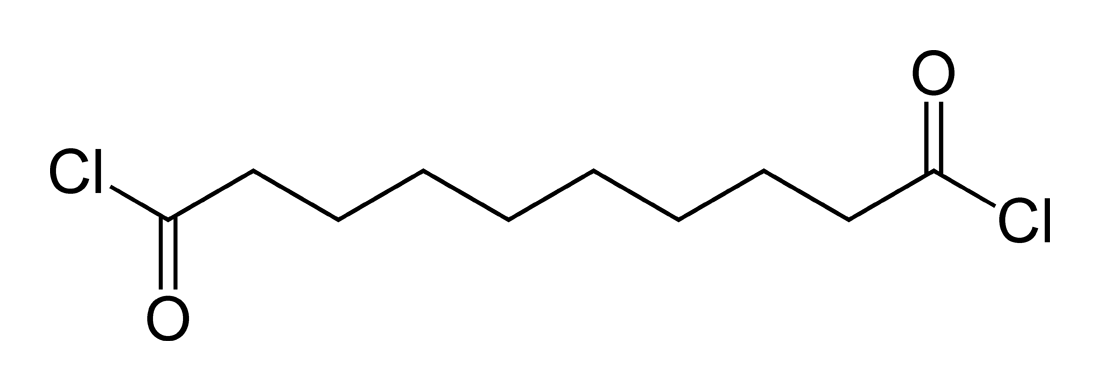
- Skeletal formula of sebacoyl chloride

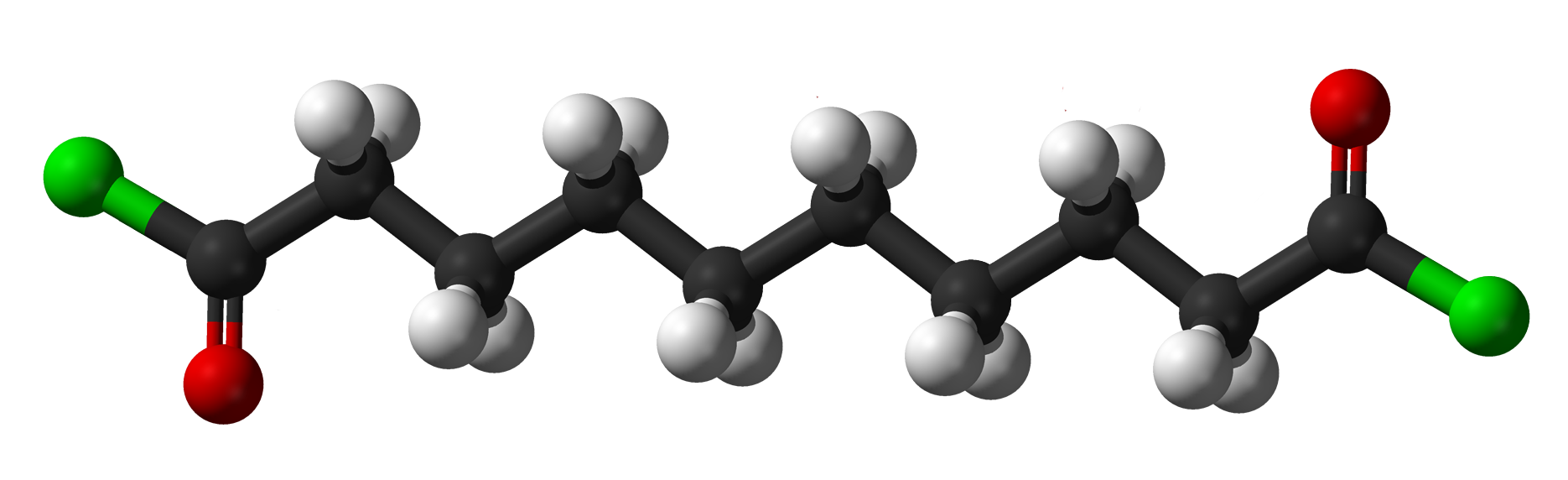
- Ball-and-stick model

Names
- Preferred IUPAC name Decanedioyl dichloride
- Other names Sebacoyl dichloride

Identifiers
CAS Number	111-19-3
3D model (JSmol)	Interactive image
ChemSpider	59462
ECHA InfoCard	100.003.495
EC Number	203-843-4
MeSH	C061659
PubChem CID	66072
UNII	8JT2RJH7AU
CompTox Dashboard (EPA)	DTXSID3059397
- InChI: InChI=1S/C10H16Cl2O2/c11-9(13)7-5-3-1-2-4-6-8-10(12)14/h1-8H2 Key: WMPOZLHMGVKUEJ-UHFFFAOYSA-N; InChI=1/C10H16Cl2O2/c11-9(13)7-5-3-1-2-4-6-8-10(12)14/h1-8H2 Key: WMPOZLHMGVKUEJ-UHFFFAOYAH
- SMILES: ClC(=O)CCCCCCCC(=O)CCl

Properties
Chemical formula	C_{10}H_{16}Cl_{2}O_{2}
Molar mass	239.14 g/mol
Density	1.12 g cm^{−3}
Melting point	−2.5 °C (27.5 °F; 270.6 K)
Boiling point	220 °C (428 °F; 493 K)

Hazards
NFPA 704 (fire diamond)	3 0 2 W
Safety data sheet (SDS)	External MSDS
- Except where otherwise noted, data are given for materials in their standard state (at 25 °C [77 °F], 100 kPa). verify (what is ?) Infobox references

Sebacoyl chloride (or sebacoyl dichloride) is a di-acyl chloride, with formula (CH_{2})_{8}(COCl)_{2}. A colorless oily liquid with a pungent odor, it is soluble in hydrocarbons and ethers. Sebacoyl chloride is corrosive; like all acyl chlorides, it hydrolyzes, evolving hydrogen chloride. It is less susceptible to hydrolysis though than shorter chain aliphatic acyl chlorides.

== Preparation ==
Sebacoyl chloride can be prepared by reacting sebacic acid with an excess of thionyl chloride. Residual thionyl chloride can be removed by distillation.

== Use ==
Sebacoyl chloride can be polymerized with hexamethylenediamine yielding nylon-6,10.

== See also ==
- Sebacic acid
- Adipoyl chloride
