= 2-Decanone =

Names
- Preferred IUPAC name Decan-2-one
- Other names Methyl octyl ketone

Identifiers
CAS Number	693-54-9
3D model (JSmol)	Interactive image
Beilstein Reference	1747463
ChEBI	CHEBI:77929
ChEMBL	ChEMBL47127
ChemSpider	12218
ECHA InfoCard	100.010.685
EC Number	211-752-6
PubChem CID	12741
UNII	GX543OLT0R
CompTox Dashboard (EPA)	DTXSID9022104
- InChI: InChI=1S/C10H20O/c1-3-4-5-6-7-8-9-10(2)11/h3-9H2,1-2H3 Key: ZAJNGDIORYACQU-UHFFFAOYSA-N
- SMILES: CCCCCCCCC(=O)C

Properties
Chemical formula	C_{10}H_{20}O
Molar mass	156.269 g·mol^{−1}
Appearance	Liquid; Fatty peachy, aldehyde-like aroma
Density	0.821-0.831 (20°)
Melting point	14 °C (57 °F; 287 K)
Boiling point	210 °C (410 °F; 483 K)
Solubility in water	Insoluble. 0.077 mg/mL at 25 °C
Solubility in Fats and oils	Soluble
log P	3.73

Hazards
- GHS labelling
Pictograms	(GHS09: Environmental hazard)
Signal word	Warning
Hazard statements	H227, H411
Precautionary statements	P210, P273, P280, P370+P378, P391, P403+P235, P501
- Except where otherwise noted, data are given for materials in their standard state (at 25 °C [77 °F], 100 kPa). Infobox references

2-Decanone is a ketone with the chemical formula C_{10}H_{20}O.

== Occurrence ==
2-Decanone can be found in meats, dairy products and eggs, fruits (banana, mountain papaya, berries), vegetables (potato, mushroom, endive, soya bean, chayote, kumazase), and grains such as maize, rice, and oats. It also is present in fish, some nuts, honey, ginger, garlic, vanilla, hop oil, mate, brandy, tea, and coffee. It is found in the highest concentrations in milk and hop oil. 2-Decanone was also found at varying percentages in the essential oils of plants within the Ruta genus, including R. montana and R. chalepensis. Within the stem bark of Commiphora rostrata, 2-decanone was found at 69%.

== Applications ==
2-Decanone has been found to possess strong fumigant activity against the maize weevil. However, it is less repellent towards the maize weevil than other alkanones.

== Synthesis ==
2-Decanone can be synthesized by reacting 2-decanol with permanganic acid and copper sulfate in DCM.
