= Dihydromyrcenol =

Names
- IUPAC name 2,6-Dimethyloct-7-en-2-ol

Identifiers
CAS Number	18479-58-8
3D model (JSmol)	Interactive image
ChEBI	CHEBI:87528
ChEMBL	ChEMBL3184487
ChemSpider	27067
DrugBank	DB02273
ECHA InfoCard	100.038.497
PubChem CID	29096
UNII	46L1B02ND9
CompTox Dashboard (EPA)	DTXSID8029317
- InChI: InChI=1S/C10H20O/c1-5-9(2)7-6-8-10(3,4)11/h5,9,11H,1,6-8H2,2-4H3 Key: XSNQECSCDATQEL-UHFFFAOYSA-N
- SMILES: CC(CCCC(C)(C)O)C=C

Properties
Chemical formula	C_{10}H_{20}O
Molar mass	156.269 g·mol^{−1}
Appearance	Colorless viscous liquid
Density	0.832 g/cm^{3} (20 °C)
Boiling point	194–197 °C (381–387 °F; 467–470 K)
Solubility in water	0.939 g/L (20 °C)

Hazards
Flash point	76 °C (169 °F; 349 K)
- Except where otherwise noted, data are given for materials in their standard state (at 25 °C [77 °F], 100 kPa). Infobox references

Dihydromyrcenol is a synthetic organic compound used primarily as a fragrance ingredient. Despite its similarity to some natural compounds of the monoterpene class, such as myrcenol, it has not been reported to be found in nature.

== Chemical properties ==
Dihydromyrcenol has the chemical formula C_{10}H_{20}O. It is a colorless viscous liquid with a boiling point of 194–197 °C (381–387 °F).

== Odor and uses ==
Dihydromyrcenol is extensively used in the fragrance industry for its fresh lime and citrus-like odor. Descriptions of its scent include citrus type, lime-like citrusy-floral sweet with considerable tenacity, fresh citrus-like with a lavender note, fresh cool metallic lime citrus floral bergamot, and lavender fragrance reminiscent of lemon. Worldwide use exceeded 1000 metric tons per year as of 2004.

== Synthesis ==
Dihydromyrcenol can be obtained from citronellene, a pyrolysis product of cis-pinane, via hydroxylation.

== Safety ==
A toxicologic and dermatologic review has been published on its use as a fragrance ingredient and it is considered safe under regulated use.
