= Stannocene =

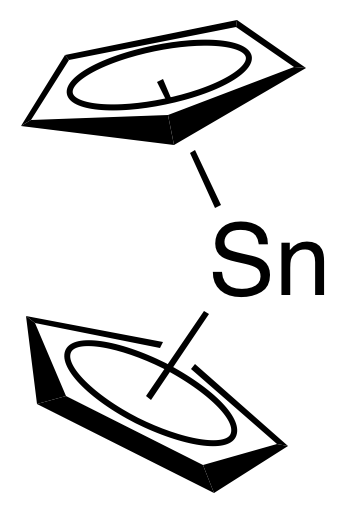

Names
- IUPAC name: Stannocene; Bis(η^{5}-cyclopentadienyl)tin(II)
- Other names: Bis(cyclopentadienyl)tin; Di(cyclopentadienyl)tin

Identifiers
CAS Number	1294-75-3
3D model (JSmol)	Interactive image
PubChem CID	12476310
- InChI: InChI=1S/2C5H5.Sn/c2*1-2-4-5-3-1;/h2*1-5H;/q2*-1;+2 Key: CRQFNSCGLAXRLM-UHFFFAOYSA-N
- SMILES: [cH-]1cccc1.[cH-]1cccc1.[Sn+2]

Properties
Chemical formula	C_{10}H_{10}Sn
Molar mass	248.900 g·mol^{−1}
Melting point	105 °C (221 °F; 378 K)

Structure
Crystal structure	orthorhombic
Space group	Pbcm, No. 57
Lattice constant	a = 5.835 Å, b = 25.385 Å, c = 12.785 Å
Formula units (Z)	8 formula per cell
- Except where otherwise noted, data are given for materials in their standard state (at 25 °C [77 °F], 100 kPa). Infobox references

Stannocene is an organometallic compound with the formula Sn(C_{5}H_{5})_{2}. It appears yellow-brown, and melts around 105 °C.

Chemically, stannocene is a metallocene that can be produced efficiently from cyclopentadienyl sodium and tin(II) chloride. Unlike in ferrocene the two cyclopentadienyl rings are not parallel.

Stannocene reacts with strong Lewis acids to give the cyclopentadienyltin(II) cation, SnC_{5}H^{+}_{5}.
