= Ocimene =

- α-Ocimene

- cis-β-Ocimene

- trans-β-Ocimene

Names
- IUPAC names α: (3E)-3,7-Dimethylocta-1,3,7-triene cis-β: (3Z)-3,7-Dimethylocta-1,3,6-triene trans-β: (3E)-3,7-Dimethylocta-1,3,6-triene

Identifiers
CAS Number	502-99-8 (α); 3338-55-4 (cis-β); 3779-61-1 (trans-β)
3D model (JSmol)	Interactive image
ChemSpider	4478389 (α)
ECHA InfoCard	100.034.205
PubChem CID	5320249 (α)
UNII	ESJ648Z6YA; 472UVP4R7T (cis-β); 38BQ4UYY06 (trans-β)
- InChI: InChI=1S/C10H16/c1-5-10(4)8-6-7-9(2)3/h5,8H,1-2,6-7H2,3-4H3/b10-8+ Key: XJPBRODHZKDRCB-CSKARUKUSA-N; InChI=1/C10H16/c1-5-10(4)8-6-7-9(2)3/h5,8H,1-2,6-7H2,3-4H3/b10-8+ Key: XJPBRODHZKDRCB-CSKARUKUBE
- SMILES: C=C\C(=C\CCC(=C)C)C

Properties
Chemical formula	C_{10}H_{16}
Molar mass	136.24 g/mol
Density	0.800 g/cm^{3}
Melting point	50 °C (122 °F; 323 K)
Boiling point	mix of isomers: 100 °C at 70 mmHg
- Except where otherwise noted, data are given for materials in their standard state (at 25 °C [77 °F], 100 kPa). verify (what is ?) Infobox references

Ocimenes are a group of isomeric hydrocarbons. The ocimenes are monoterpenes found within a variety of plants and fruits. α-Ocimene and the two β-ocimenes differ in the position of the isolated double bond: it is terminal in the alpha isomer. α-Ocimene is cis-3,7-dimethyl-1,3,7-octatriene. β-Ocimene is trans-3,7-dimethyl-1,3,6-octatriene. β-Ocimene exists in two stereoisomeric forms, cis and trans, with respect to the central double bond.

The ocimenes are often found naturally as mixtures of the various forms. The mixture, as well as the pure compounds, are oils with a pleasant odor. They are used in perfumery for their sweet herbal scent and are believed to act as plant defense and have anti-fungal properties. Like the related acyclic terpene myrcene, ocimenes are unstable in air. Like other terpenes, the ocimenes are nearly insoluble in water, but soluble in common organic solvents.

The name is derived from the plant genus name Ocimum from the Ancient Greek word for basil, ὤκιμον (ṓkimon).
