= Grandisol =

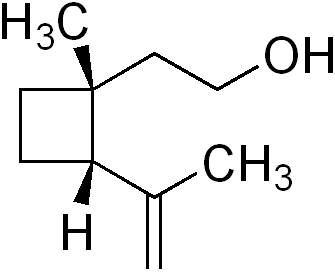

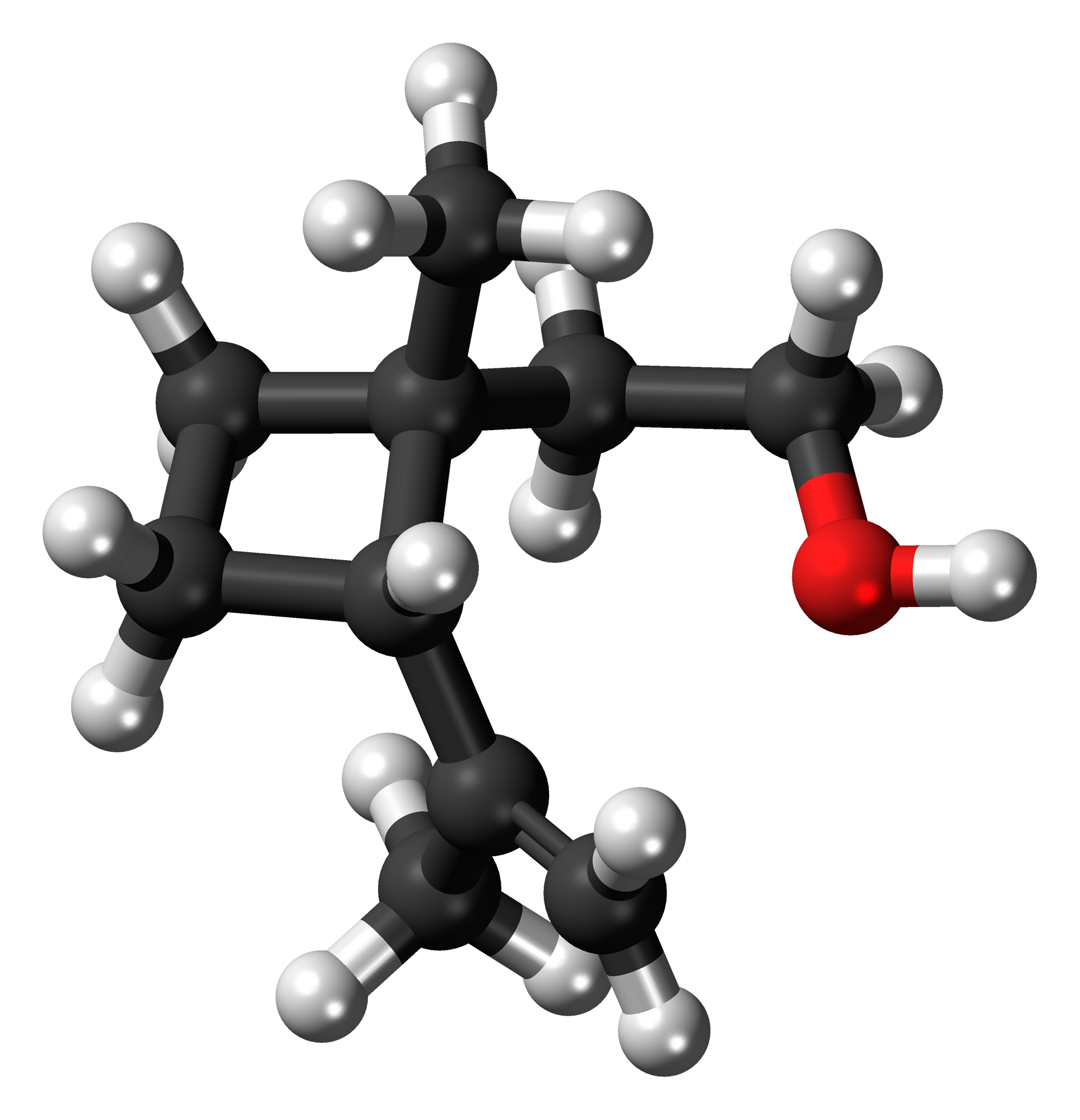

Names
- Preferred IUPAC name 2-[(1R,2S)-1-Methyl-2-(prop-1-en-2-yl)cyclobutyl]ethan-1-ol
- Other names cis-2-Isopropenyl-1-methylcyclobutaneethanol

Identifiers
CAS Number	26532-22-9
3D model (JSmol)	Interactive image
ChemSpider	147990
PubChem CID	169202
UNII	9S44Q9MKXB
CompTox Dashboard (EPA)	DTXSID70896937 DTXSID2035275, DTXSID70896937
- InChI: InChI=1S/C10H18O/c1-8(2)9-4-5-10(9,3)6-7-11/h9,11H,1,4-7H2,2-3H3/t9-,10+/m0/s1 Key: SJKPJXGGNKMRPD-VHSXEESVSA-N
- SMILES: OCC[C@]1(C)[C@H](C(=C)C)CC1

Properties
Chemical formula	C_{10}H_{18}O
Molar mass	154.25 g/mol
Melting point	< 25 °C (77 °F; 298 K)
Boiling point	50 to 60 °C (122 to 140 °F; 323 to 333 K) at 1 mmHg
- Except where otherwise noted, data are given for materials in their standard state (at 25 °C [77 °F], 100 kPa). verify (what is ?) Infobox references

Grandisol is a natural organic compound with the molecular formula C_{10}H_{18}O. It is a monoterpene containing a cyclobutane ring, an alcohol group, an alkene group and two chiral centers (one of which is quaternary).

Grandisol is a pheromone primarily important as the sex attractant of the cotton boll weevil (Anthonomus grandis), from which it gets its name. It is also a pheromone for other related insects. The cotton boll weevil is an agricultural pest that can cause significant economic damage if not controlled. Grandisol is the major constituent of the mixture known as grandlure, which is used to protect cotton crops from the boll weevil.

== Synthesis ==
Grandisol was first isolated, identified, and synthesized by J. Tumlinson et al. at Mississippi State University in 1969. The most recent and highest yielding synthetic route to grandisol was reported in January 2010 by a group of chemists at Furman University. Though enantioselective syntheses have been reported, racemic grandisol has proven equally effective at attracting boll weevils as the natural enantiomer, rendering moot the need for enantioselective syntheses for agricultural purposes.
