= Neodecanoic acid =

- Example components of neodecanoic acid

Identifiers
CAS Number	26896-20-8
ECHA InfoCard	100.043.707
EC Number	248-093-9
UNII	GI044Q7IJ4
CompTox Dashboard (EPA)	DTXSID7027916

Properties
Chemical formula	C_{10}H_{20}O_{2}
Molar mass	172.268 g·mol^{−1}
Appearance	Colorless liquid
Density	0.92
Melting point	-39 °C
Boiling point	243 - 253 °C
Solubility in water	Solubility in water, g/100ml at 25 °C: 0.025

Hazards
- GHS labelling
Pictograms	(GHS05: Corrosive) (GHS07: Exclamation mark)
Signal word	Warning
Hazard statements	H302, H315, H318, H319, H412
Flash point	122 °C (252 °F; 395 K)
- Except where otherwise noted, data are given for materials in their standard state (at 25 °C [77 °F], 100 kPa). Infobox references

Neodecanoic acid (NDA) is a mixture of carboxylic acids with the common chemical formula C_{10}H_{20}O_{2}. NDA is a colorless liquid with a relatively low vapor pressure and it's widely used in industrial synthesis processes. As mixture of constitutional isomers, we can identify some properties shared with trialkyl acetic acid by the following isomers:

- 2,2,3,5-Tetramethylhexanoic acid
- 2,4-Dimethyl-2-isopropylpentanoic acid
- 2,5-Dimethyl-2-ethylhexanoic acid
- 2,2-Dimethyloctanoic acid
- 2,2-Diethylhexanoic acid

== Properties ==
=== Acidity ===
The proton of the carboxyl group (−COOH) of Neodecanoic acid can be separated with the reaction proceeding as follows:

RCOOH ⇌ RCO^{−}_{2} + H^{+}

With R being any aliphatic groups with 9 carbon atoms. Thanks to the release of the proton Neodecanoic acid have a weak acidic character. Being a monoprotic acid, it has only one dissociation, with the pK_{a} of the strongest acid form valued at 5.17.
