= Pinene =

Oily organic chemical found in plants

- Pinene

Names
- IUPAC names (1S,5S)-2,6,6-trimethylbicyclo[3.1.1]hept-2-ene (1S,5S)-6,6-dimethyl-2-methylenebicyclo[3.1.1]heptane

Identifiers
CAS Number	(mixture): 1330-16-1; (1R-α): 7785-70-8; (1S-α): 7785-26-4; (1R-β): 19902-08-0; (1S-β): 18172-67-3
3D model (JSmol)	(mixture): Interactive image; (1R-α): Interactive image; (1R-β): Interactive image; (1S-β): Interactive image
ChEBI	(mixture): CHEBI:17187; (1R-α): CHEBI:28261; (1S-α): CHEBI:28660; (1S-β): CHEBI:50025
ChEMBL	(1R-β): ChEMBL2269085; (1S-β): ChEMBL3184774
ChemSpider	(1R-α): 74205; (1S-α): 389795; (1R-β): 8466294; (1S-β): 14198
ECHA InfoCard	100.029.170
EC Number	(1R-α): 232-087-8
PubChem CID	(1R-α): 82227; (1S-α): 15837102; (1R-β): 10290825; (1S-β): 440967
UNII	(mixture): 996299PUKB; (1R-α): H6CM4TWH1W; (1S-α): TZR3GM95PR; (1R-β): IGO73S04D5; (1S-β): AFN153A7SU
CompTox Dashboard (EPA)	(mixture): DTXSID7041671
- InChI: InChI=1S/C10H16/c1-7-4-5-8-6-9(7)10(8,2)3/h8H,4-6H2,1-3H3 Key: NDUIFQPPDDOKRN-UHFFFAOYSA-N; (1R-α): InChI=1S/C10H16/c1-7-4-5-8-6-9(7)10(8,2)3/h4,8-9H,5-6H2,1-3H3/t8-,9-/m1/s1 Key: GRWFGVWFFZKLTI-RKDXNWHRSA-N; (1R-β): InChI=1S/C10H16/c1-7-4-5-8-6-9(7)10(8,2)3/h8-9H,1,4-6H2,2-3H3/t8-,9-/m1/s1 Key: WTARULDDTDQWMU-RKDXNWHRSA-N; (1S-β): InChI=1S/C10H16/c1-7-4-5-8-6-9(7)10(8,2)3/h8-9H,1,4-6H2,2-3H3/t8-,9-/m0/s1 Key: WTARULDDTDQWMU-IUCAKERBSA-N
- SMILES: (mixture): CC1=CCC2CC1C2(C)C; (1R-α): CC1=CC[C@@H]2C[C@H]1C2(C)C; (1R-β): CC1([C@@H]2CCC(=C)[C@H]1C2)C; (1S-β): CC1([C@H]2CCC(=C)[C@@H]1C2)C

Properties
Chemical formula	C_{10}H_{16}
Molar mass	136.24 g/mol
Appearance	Liquid
Density	0.86 g·cm^{−3} (alpha, 15 °C)
Melting point	−62 to −55 °C (−80 to −67 °F; 211 to 218 K) (alpha)
Boiling point	155 to 156 °C (311 to 313 °F; 428 to 429 K) (alpha)
Solubility in water	Practically insoluble in water
- Except where otherwise noted, data are given for materials in their standard state (at 25 °C [77 °F], 100 kPa). verify (what is ?) Infobox references

Pinene is a collection of unsaturated bicyclic monoterpenes. Two geometric isomers of pinene are found in nature, α-pinene and β-pinene. Both are chiral, and both contain a strained four-membered ring. As the name suggests, pinenes are found in pines. Specifically, pinene is the major component of the liquid extracts of conifers. Pinenes are also found in many non-coniferous plants such as camphorweed (Heterotheca) and big sagebrush (Artemisia tridentata).

== Isomers ==
skeletal formula				
perspective view	X		X	
ball-and-stick model			X	
name	(1R)-(+)-α-pinene	(1S)-(−)-α-pinene	(1R)-(+)-β-pinene	(1S)-(−)-β-pinene
CAS number	7785-70-8	7785-26-4	19902-08-0	18172-67-3

== Biosynthesis ==
α-Pinene and β-pinene are both produced from geranyl pyrophosphate, via cyclisation of linaloyl pyrophosphate followed by loss of a proton from the carbocation equivalent. Researchers at the Georgia Institute of Technology and the Joint BioEnergy Institute have been able to synthetically produce pinene with a bacterium.

Biosynthesis of pinene from geranyl pyrophosphate

== Plants ==
Alpha-pinene is the most widely encountered terpenoid in nature and is highly repellent to insects.

Alpha-pinene appears in conifers and numerous other plants. Pinene is a major component of the essential oils of Sideritis spp. (ironwort) and Salvia spp. (sage). Cannabis also contains alpha-pinene and beta-pinene, as well as the dried finished flowers known as marijuana. Resin from Pistacia terebinthus (commonly known as terebinth or turpentine tree) is rich in pinene. Pine nuts produced by pine trees contain pinene.

Makrut lime fruit peel contains an essential oil comparable to lime fruit peel oil; its main components are limonene and β-pinene. Essential oils of other citrus fruits like oranges and lemons also include racemic mixtures of alpha- and beta-pinene. Oils of herbs like rosemary and basil also contain racemic mixtures of pinene.

The racemic mixture of the two forms of pinene is found in some oils like eucalyptus oil.

== Reactions ==
=== α-Pinene ===
Selective oxidation of α-pinene occurs at the allylic position to give verbenone, along with pinene oxide, as well as verbenol and its hydroperoxide.

Pinene left verbenone right

Pinene's chiral bicyclic nature and availability makes it an attractive chiral starting material for complex syntheses. For example, pinene was explored by Paul Wender as a starting material for his total synthesis of taxol.

α-Pinene can be converted to camphor by way of isobornyl acetate. Hydrogenation of pinene gives pinane, precursor to a useful pinanehydroperoxide. The hydroboration of α-pinene has been extensively examined. With borane-dimethylsulfide, two equivalents of α-pinene react to give (diisopinocampheyl)borane. Reaction with 9-BBN gives the reagent called alpine borane. This sterically crowded chiral trialkylborane can stereoselectively reduce aldehydes in what is known as the Midland Alpine borane reduction.

=== β-pinene ===
β-pinene can be converted to α-pinene in the presence of strong bases, or pyrolysed to produce myrcene at 400 °C.

== Use ==
Pinenes, especially α, are the primary constituents of turpentine, a nature-derived solvent and fuel.

The use of pinene as a biofuel in spark ignition engines has been explored. Pinene dimers have been shown to have heating values comparable to the jet fuel JP-10.

α-Pinene is shown to have anti-inflammatory and memory-boosting properties.

== Bibliography ==
- Mann, J.; Davidson, R. S.; Hobbs, J. B.; Banthorpe, D. V.; Harborne, J. B. (1994). Natural Products. Harlow, UK: Addison Wesley Longman Ltd. pp. 309–311. ISBN 978-0-582-06009-8.
