= C10H16 =

The molecular formula C_{10}H_{16} (molar mass: 136.24 g/mol) may refer to:

== Monoterpenes ==
- Bornylene
- Camphene
- Carene
- Limonene
- α-Myrcene
- β-Myrcene
- Ocimene
- Phellandrene
- Pinenes
  - α-Pinene
  - β-Pinene
- Sabinene
- Terpinene
- Thujene

== Other compounds ==
- Adamantane
- Cyclodecyne
- Pentamethylcyclopentadiene
- Syntin
- Tricyclodecane
- Twistane
