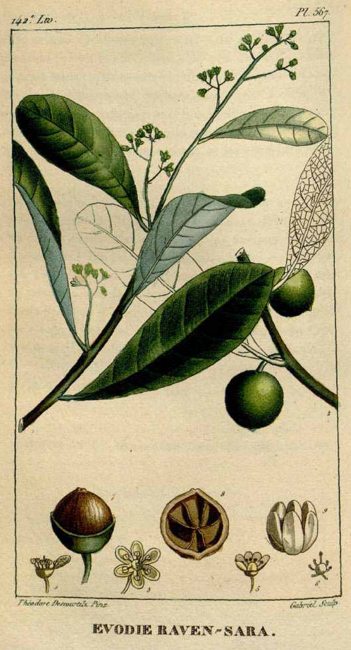

Conservation status
- Near Threatened (IUCN 3.1)

Scientific classification
- Kingdom: Plantae
- Clade: Tracheophytes
- Clade: Angiosperms
- Clade: Magnoliids
- Order: Laurales
- Family: Lauraceae
- Genus: Cryptocarya
- Species: C. agathophylla

Binomial name
- Cryptocarya agathophylla van der Werff

Synonyms
- Agathophyllum aromaticum (Sonn.) Schreb. ex Forsyth f.; Agathophyllum ravensara Mirb. ex Steud.; Evodia aromatica (Sonn.) Pers.; Evodia ravensarae Gaertn.; Ravensara anisata Danguy; Ravensara aromatica J.F.Gmel.; Ravensara aromatica Sonn.

= Cryptocarya agathophylla =

Species of plant

Cryptocarya agathophylla (known sometimes as clove nutmeg) is a member of the laurel family, Lauraceae, and originates in Madagascar.

Malagasy names include tavolobelelo, havozo, hazomanitra and tavolomanitra. The former genus name Ravensara is a latinization of the Malagasy word ravintsara. However, ravintsara more properly refers to a local high-cineole chemotype of Camphora officinarum.

== Description ==
Cryptocarya agathophylla is a small to medium-sized tree, growing up to 15 meters high. The leaves and twigs of C. agathophylla have a mildly camphorous aroma similar to eucalyptus.

== Range and habitat ==
Cryptocarya agathophylla is endemic to Madagascar. It grows in humid and subhumid lowland forests and lower montane forests and secondary vegetation between 10 and 1,300 meters elevation.

It is known from 11 locations in the central and eastern parts of Bongolava, Vatovavy Analanjirofo and Alaotra-Mangoro regions. Its estimated extent of occurrence (EOO) is 116,739 km^{2}, the minimum area of occupancy (AOO) is 56 km^{2}.

== Conservation and threats ==
The species' population is decreasing, and its conservation status is Near Threatened. It is threatened by habitat loss, principally from shifting agriculture, and also from logging, mining, and grazing.

== Essential oil ==
The essential oil of C. agathophylla is used as a fragrance material in the perfumery industry, and as an antiseptic, anti-viral, antibacterial, expectorant, anti-infective in natural and folk medicine. Primary aromatic components are:

- limonene 19.38%
- sabinene 11.40%
- methyl chavicol 7.94%
- α-pinene 5.55%
- linalool 5.26%
- methyl eugenol 5.00%
- germacrene d 4.76%
- terpinen-4-ol 4.00%
- e-caryophyllene 3.54%
- δ-3-carene 3.52%
- myrcene 3.43%
- α-terpinene 2.98%
- β-pinene 2.91%
- γ-terpinene 2.15%
- α-phellandrene 1.99%
- camphene 1.33%
- (z)-β-ocimene 1.30%
- α-thujene 1.13%
- 1,8-cineole 1.08%
- para-cymene 0.97%
- α-humulene 0.79%
- α-copaene 0.69%
- β-elemene 0.63%
- δ-cadinene 0.60%
- terpinolene 0.56%
- δ-elemene 0.55%
- α-cubebene 0.47%
- α-terpineol 0.38%
- α-guaiene 0.37%
- bornyl acetate 0.36%
- elemol 0.34%
- elemicin 0.23%
- γ-muurolene 0.22%
- borneol 0.21%
- bicyclogermacrene 0.20%
- γ-cadinene 0.19%
- (e)-β-ocimene 0.19%
- β-cubebene 0.16%
- eugenol 0.12%
- α-muurolene 0.11%
- δ-amorphene 0.10%
- α-eudesmol 0.10%
- cis-para-menth-2-en-1-ol 0.10%
- ortho-cymene 0.09%
- β-selinene 0.09%
- β-bourbonene 0.08%
- trans-cadina-1,4-diene 0.08%
- trans-para-menth-2-en-1-ol 0.08%
- cis-sabinene hydrate 0.08%
- trans-sabinene hydrate 0.08%
- caryophyllene oxide 0.07%
- β-copaene 0.07%
- germacrene b 0.07%
- cis-muurola-3,5-diene 0.07%
- trans-cadina-1(6),4-diene 0.06%
- γ-eudesmol 0.06%
- β-eudesmol 0.05%
- guaiol 0.05%
