= Terpene alcohol =

Terpene alcohol may refer to a variety of terpenoids, i.e. terpenes modified with one or more hydroxy groups:

Terpenols

- Terpineol
- Geraniol
- Linalool
- Citronellol
- Nerol
- Myrcenol
- Lavandulol
- pinanol

Geraniol, nerol, linalool, and citronellol constitute the rose alcohols

Sesquiterpenols

- Farnesol
- Nerolidol
- bisabolol
- cubebol

Tetraterpenes

- retinol
