= Linalool dehydratase =

Identifiers
- EC no.: 4.2.1.127

Databases
- IntEnz: IntEnz view
- BRENDA: BRENDA entry
- ExPASy: NiceZyme view
- KEGG: KEGG entry
- MetaCyc: metabolic pathway
- PRIAM: profile
- PDB structures: RCSB PDB PDBe PDBsum
Search
- PMC: articles
- PubMed: articles
- NCBI: proteins

Linalool dehydratase (EC 4.2.1.127, linalool hydro-lyase (myrcene-forming)) is an enzyme with systematic name (3S)-linalool hydro-lyase (myrcene-forming). This enzyme catalyses the following chemical reaction

(3S)-linalool $\rightleftharpoons$ myrcene + H_{2}O

In absence of oxygen this enzyme can also catalyse the isomerization of (3S)-linalool to geraniol.
