= Dimethylallylcistransferase =

Class of enzymes

Identifiers
- EC no.: 2.5.1.28
- CAS no.: 9032-79-5

Databases
- IntEnz: IntEnz view
- BRENDA: BRENDA entry
- ExPASy: NiceZyme view
- KEGG: KEGG entry
- MetaCyc: metabolic pathway
- PRIAM: profile
- PDB structures: RCSB PDB PDBe PDBsum
- Gene Ontology: AmiGO / QuickGO
Search
- PMC: articles
- PubMed: articles
- NCBI: proteins

Dimethylallylcistransferase (EC 2.5.1.28) is an enzyme that catalyzes the chemical reaction

dimethylallyl pyrophosphate
+
isopentenyl pyrophosphate
PP_{i}
neryl pyrophosphate

Thus, the two substrates of this enzyme characterised from Pinus radiata and Tanacetum vulgare are dimethylallyl pyrophosphate and isopentenyl pyrophosphate. Its products are neryl pyrophosphate and pyrophosphate (PP_{i}). The enzyme is part of the pathway to terpene alcohols such as nerol.

This enzyme belongs to the family of transferases, specifically those transferring aryl or alkyl groups other than methyl groups. The systematic name of this enzyme class is dimethylallyl-diphosphate:isopentenyl-diphosphate dimethylallylcistransferase. This enzyme is also called neryl-diphosphate synthase.
