= OR2M7 =

Protein-coding gene in humans

Identifiers
- Aliases: OR2M7, OR1-58, olfactory receptor family 2 subfamily M member 7
- External IDs: OMIM: 618509; GeneCards: OR2M7

Gene location (Human)
Chr.	Chromosome 1 (human)
Band	1q44	Start	248,323,630 bp
Band	1q44	End	248,324,568 bp
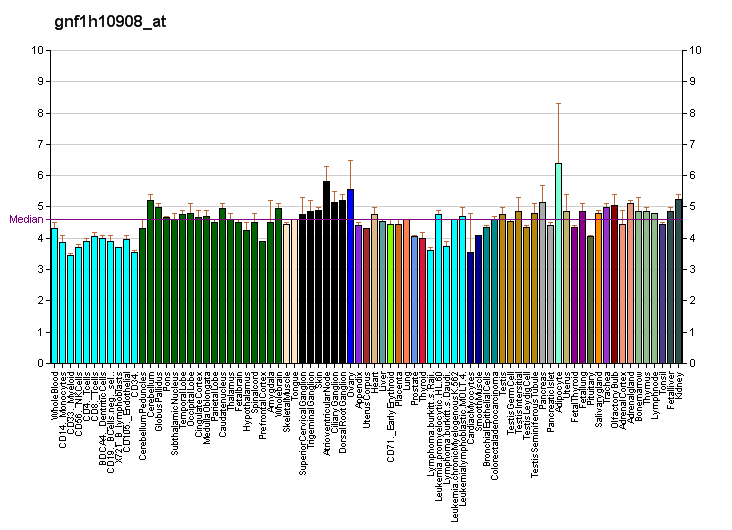
RNA expression pattern
Bgee	Human / Mouse (ortholog); Top expressed in: testicle; primary visual cortex / n/a; More reference expression data
BioGPS	More reference expression data
Gene ontology
Molecular function	signal transducer activity; olfactory receptor activity; G protein-coupled receptor activity
Cellular component	plasma membrane; membrane; integral component of membrane
Biological process	sensory perception of smell; signal transduction; response to stimulus; detection of chemical stimulus involved in sensory perception of smell; G protein-coupled receptor signaling pathway
Sources:Amigo / QuickGO
Orthologs
Databases	NCBI: entry; OMA: entry
Species	Human	Mouse
Entrez	391196	n/a
Ensembl	ENSG00000177186	n/a
UniProt	Q8NG81	n/a
RefSeq (mRNA)	NM_001004691	n/a
RefSeq (protein)	NP_001004691	n/a
Location (UCSC)	Chr 1: 248.32 – 248.32 Mb	n/a
PubMed search		n/a
- Wikidata
View/Edit Human

Olfactory receptor 2M7 is a protein that in humans is encoded by the OR2M7 gene.

Olfactory receptors interact with odorant molecules in the nose, to initiate a neuronal response that triggers the perception of a smell. The olfactory receptor proteins are members of a large family of G-protein-coupled receptors (GPCR) arising from single coding-exon genes. Olfactory receptors share a 7-transmembrane domain structure with many neurotransmitter and hormone receptors and are responsible for the recognition and G protein-mediated transduction of odorant signals. The olfactory receptor gene family is the largest in the genome. The nomenclature assigned to the olfactory receptor genes and proteins for this organism is independent of other organisms.

== Ligands ==
Agonists include:

- (-)-Citronellol
- Geraniol

== See also ==
- Olfactory receptor
