= Rhodinol =

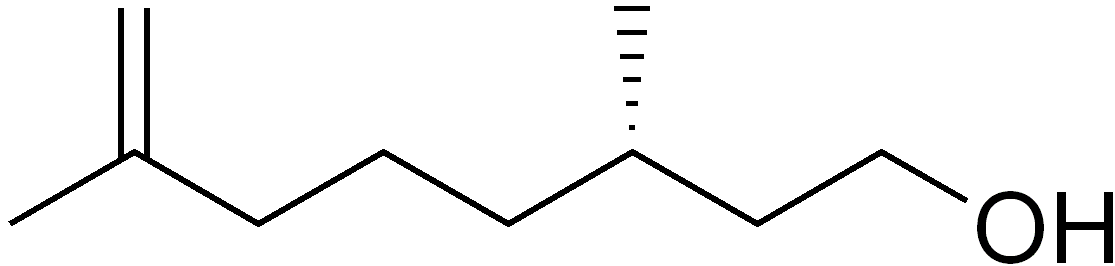

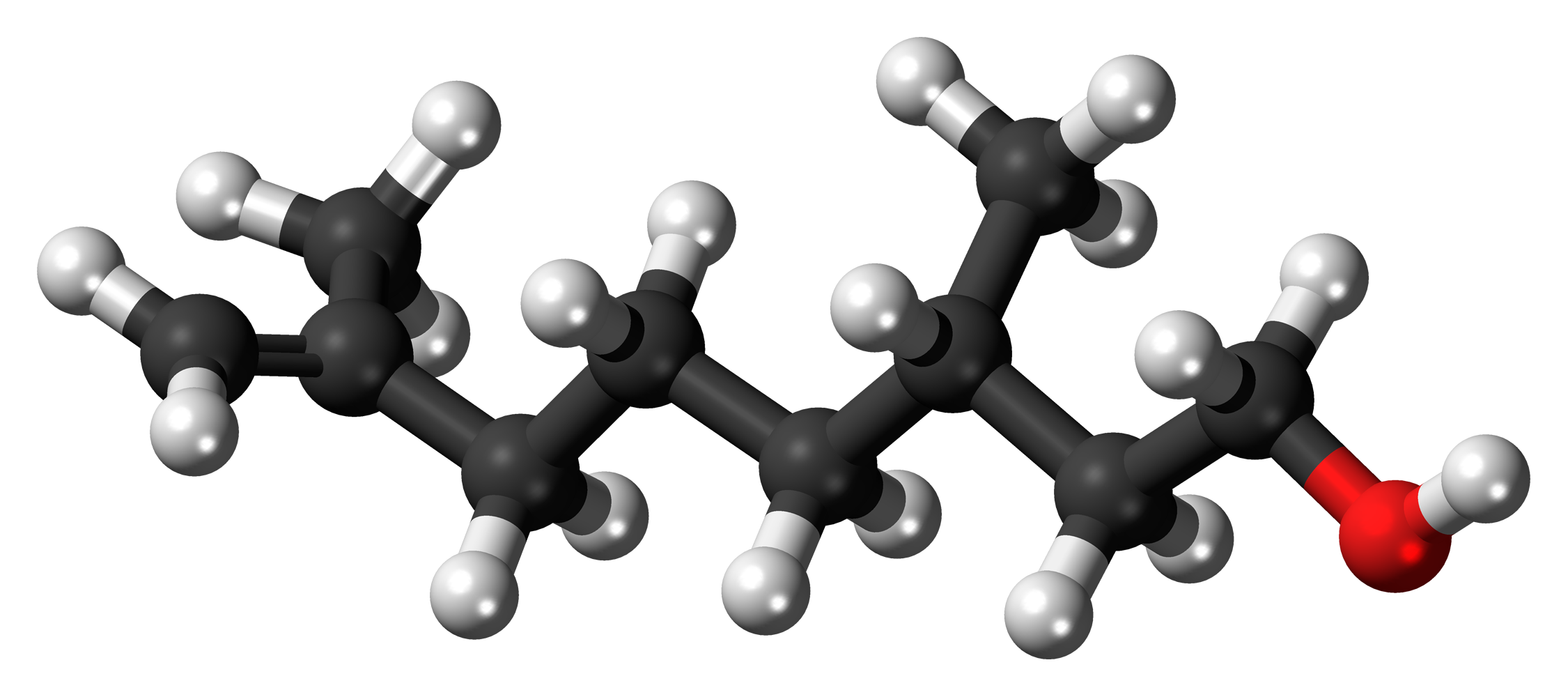
- C=black, H=white, O=red

Names
- Preferred IUPAC name (3S)-3,7-Dimethyloct-7-en-1-ol
- Other names α-Citronellol, 3,7-Dimethyl-(6- or 7-)octen-1-ol, 3,7-Dimethyl-7-octen-1-ol, 1-Citronellol

Identifiers
CAS Number	6812-78-8; racemate: 141-25-3.
3D model (JSmol)	Interactive image
ChEMBL	ChEMBL3182701
ChemSpider	73319
ECHA InfoCard	100.004.977
EC Number	229-887-4; racemate: 205-473-9
PubChem CID	81263
UNII	1V437W60X9
CompTox Dashboard (EPA)	DTXSID2047193
- InChI: InChI=1S/C10H20O/c1-9(2)5-4-6-10(3)7-8-11/h10-11H,1,4-8H2,2-3H3/t10-/m0/s1 Key: JGQFVRIQXUFPAH-JTQLQIEISA-N
- SMILES: C[C@H](CCO)CCCC(C)=C

Properties
Chemical formula	C_{10}H_{20}O
Molar mass	156.269 g·mol^{−1}

Hazards
- GHS labelling
Pictograms	(GHS02: Flammable) (GHS07: Exclamation mark) (GHS09: Environmental hazard)
Signal word	Danger
Hazard statements	H315, H317, H318, H319, H411
Precautionary statements	P261, P264, P272, P273, P280, P302+P352, P305+P351+P338, P310, P321, P332+P313, P333+P313, P337+P313, P362, P363, P391, P501
- Except where otherwise noted, data are given for materials in their standard state (at 25 °C [77 °F], 100 kPa). verify (what is ?) Infobox references

Rhodinol is the chemical compound 3,7-dimethyloct-7-en-1-ol. As the (3S) isomer it is CAS 6812-78-8, and as the racemate it is CAS 141-25-3.

In the field of perfumery materials, the term may refer to L-citronellol, to mixtures comprising mostly L- or racemic citronellol and geraniol, or to mixtures comprising mostly racemic 3,7-dimethyloct-7-en-1-ol and racemic citronellol.

Two example synthetic Rhodinol products are:

- Rhodinol 70, a racemic mixture comprising 40–60% 3,7-dimethyloct-7-en-1-ol and 40–60% citronellol
- Sigma-Aldrich Rhodinol, which consists of L-citronellol and geraniol.

Rhodinol is also provided in perfumery in natural grades as materials extracted from geranium or citronella, comprising principally citronellol and geraniol.

Rhodinol products are used in cosmetics and perfumery to impart flowery odors, particularly but not limited to being a component of rosy odor.

3,7-Dimethyloct-7-en-1-ol does not appear substantively in nature.

== See also ==
- Perfume allergy
