= C10H22O =

The molecular formula C_{10}H_{22}O (molar mass: 158.28 g/mol, exact mass: 158.1671 u) may refer to:

- 1-Decanol
- 3,7-Dimethyl-1-octanol
- 2-Propylheptanol (2PH)
