= Α-Myrcene =

α-Myrcene

Names
- IUPAC name 2-Methyl-6-methylideneocta-1,7-diene
- Other names alpha-Myrcene

Identifiers
CAS Number	1686-30-2
3D model (JSmol)	Interactive image
ChemSpider	452986
PubChem CID	519324
CompTox Dashboard (EPA)	DTXSID50333971
- InChI: InChI=1S/C10H16/c1-5-10(4)8-6-7-9(2)3/h5H,1-2,4,6-8H2,3H3 Key: VYBREYKSZAROCT-UHFFFAOYSA-N
- SMILES: C=CC(=C)CCCC(=C)C

Properties
Chemical formula	C_{10}H_{16}
Molar mass	136.238 g·mol^{−1}
Appearance	colorless liquid
Density	0.7959 g/cm^{3}
Boiling point	44 °C (111 °F; 317 K) 10 mm Hg
Refractive index (n_{D})	1.4661
- Except where otherwise noted, data are given for materials in their standard state (at 25 °C [77 °F], 100 kPa). Infobox references

α-Myrcene is an organic compound with the formula CH_{2}=C(CH_{3})CH_{2}CH_{2}CH_{2}C(=CH_{2})CH=CH_{2}. It is an uncommon monoterpene. It is isomeric with β-myrcene, both being trienes.

α-Myrcene has been found in the essential oils of a few species, such as the Balkan pine (Pinus peuce) and lemongrass (Cymbopogon).

It differs from the β isomer by the position of one of the three alkene units. The two chemicals can be synthesized in a 3:1 α:β isomeric ratio by pyrolysis of the acetate ester of myrcenol.
