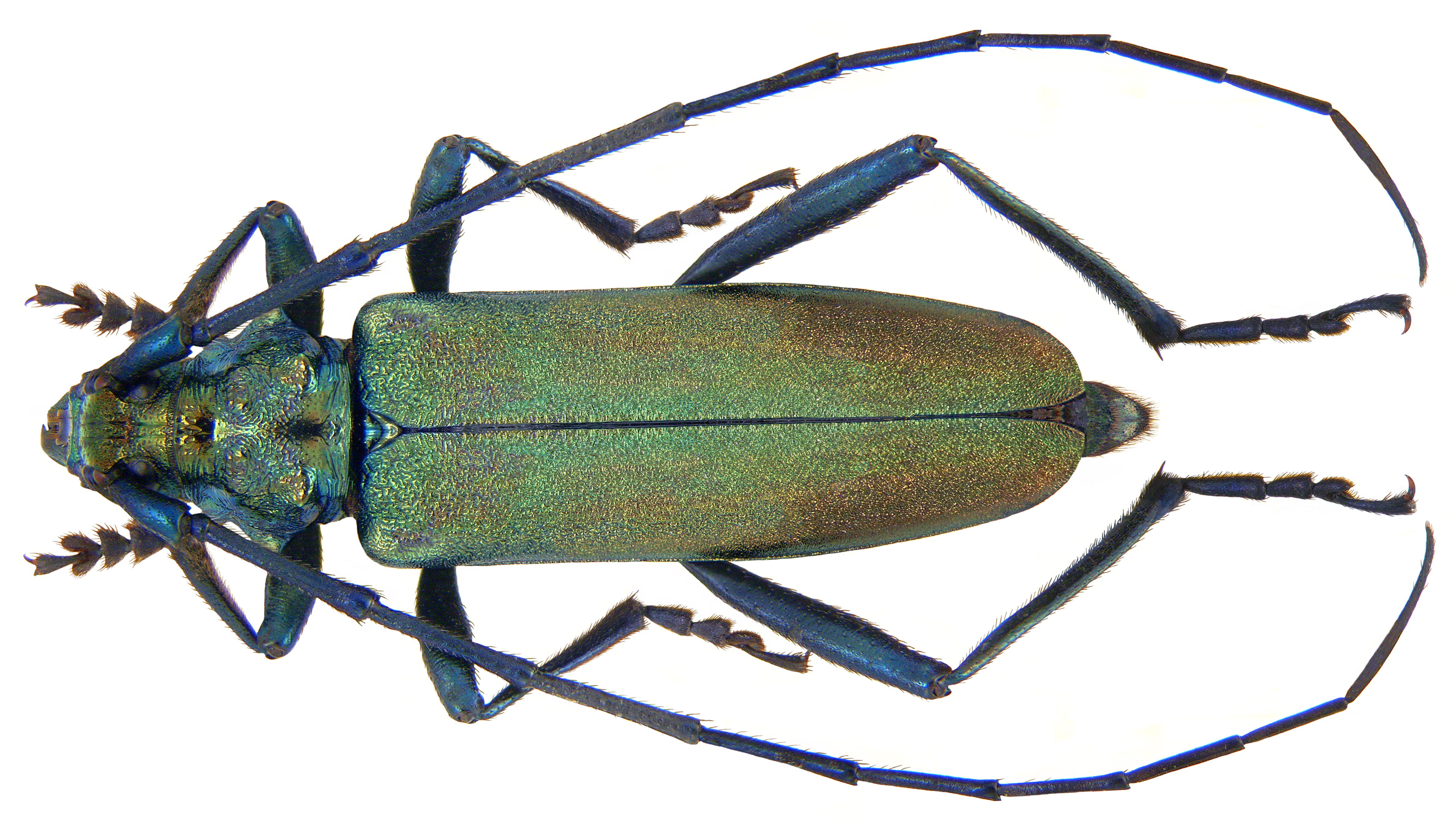

Scientific classification
- Kingdom: Animalia
- Phylum: Arthropoda
- Class: Insecta
- Order: Coleoptera
- Suborder: Polyphaga
- Infraorder: Cucujiformia
- Family: Cerambycidae
- Genus: Aromia
- Species: A. moschata

Binomial name
- Aromia moschata (Linnaeus, 1758)

= Musk beetle =

Species of beetle

The musk beetle (Aromia moschata) is a Eurasian species of longhorn beetle belonging to the subfamily Cerambycinae, tribe Callichromatini. Its name comes from the delicate musky smell it emits when menaced. The beetle has a shell with an iridescence tone that changes with the angle of view. It has a hard shell around the thorax with hard sharp spines.

== Description ==
This beetle is characterised by long antennae (like all other cerambycids) and a somewhat coppery or greenish metallic tint. The typical form, characterised by a pronotum with a metallic color, is widespread in Europe, except for most of Spain and Southern Italy. In such regions, in North and East Africa, and in Asia to Japan, the species is represented by some subspecies characterised by a more or less red pronotum. The antennae are longer than the entire head and body length in male and as long as body in females. Nevertheless, the Oriental subspecies have usually shorter antennae.

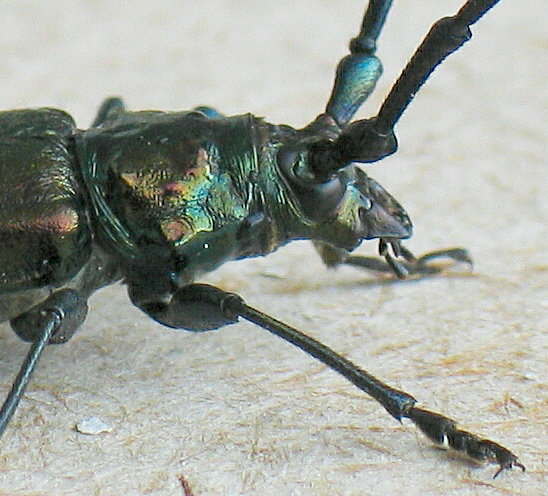
Close-up of the mouthparts

The musk beetle can be found in Great Britain locally, for example at Caldicot and Wentloog Levels—otherwise known as Gwent Levels SSSI

== Biology ==
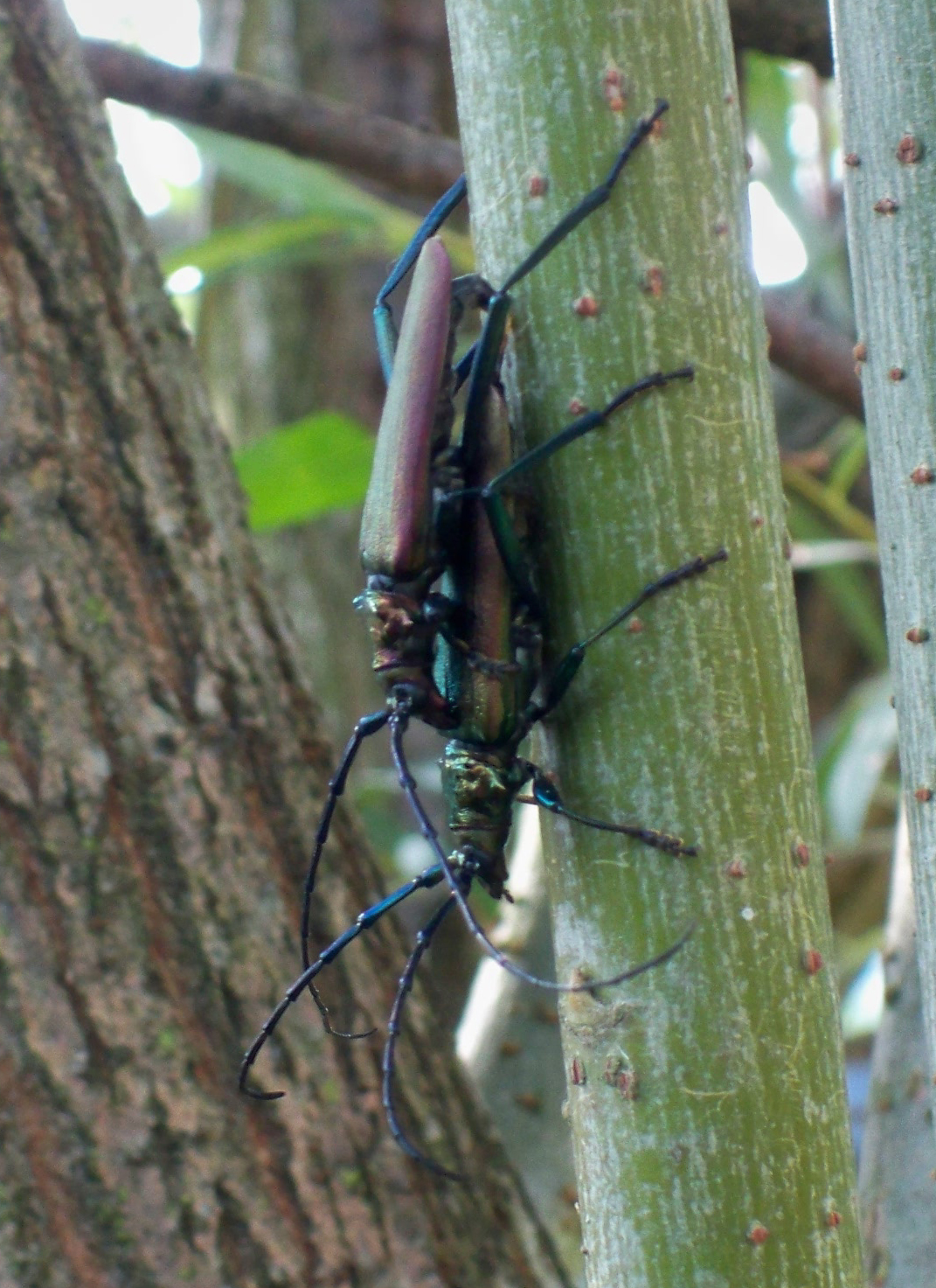
Mating musk beetles

The adults are usually found on leaves, especially those of the willow trees, where the larva of this species lives. The secretion with the characteristic musky smell is produced in thoracic glands, and is expelled through openings located on the distal part of the metasternum, near the hind legs articulation. The secretion was formerly supposed to contain salicylaldehyde or a salicylic ether, but there is now evidence that it consists instead mainly of four different monoterpenes, among which is rose oxide, one of the most important fragrances in perfumery.

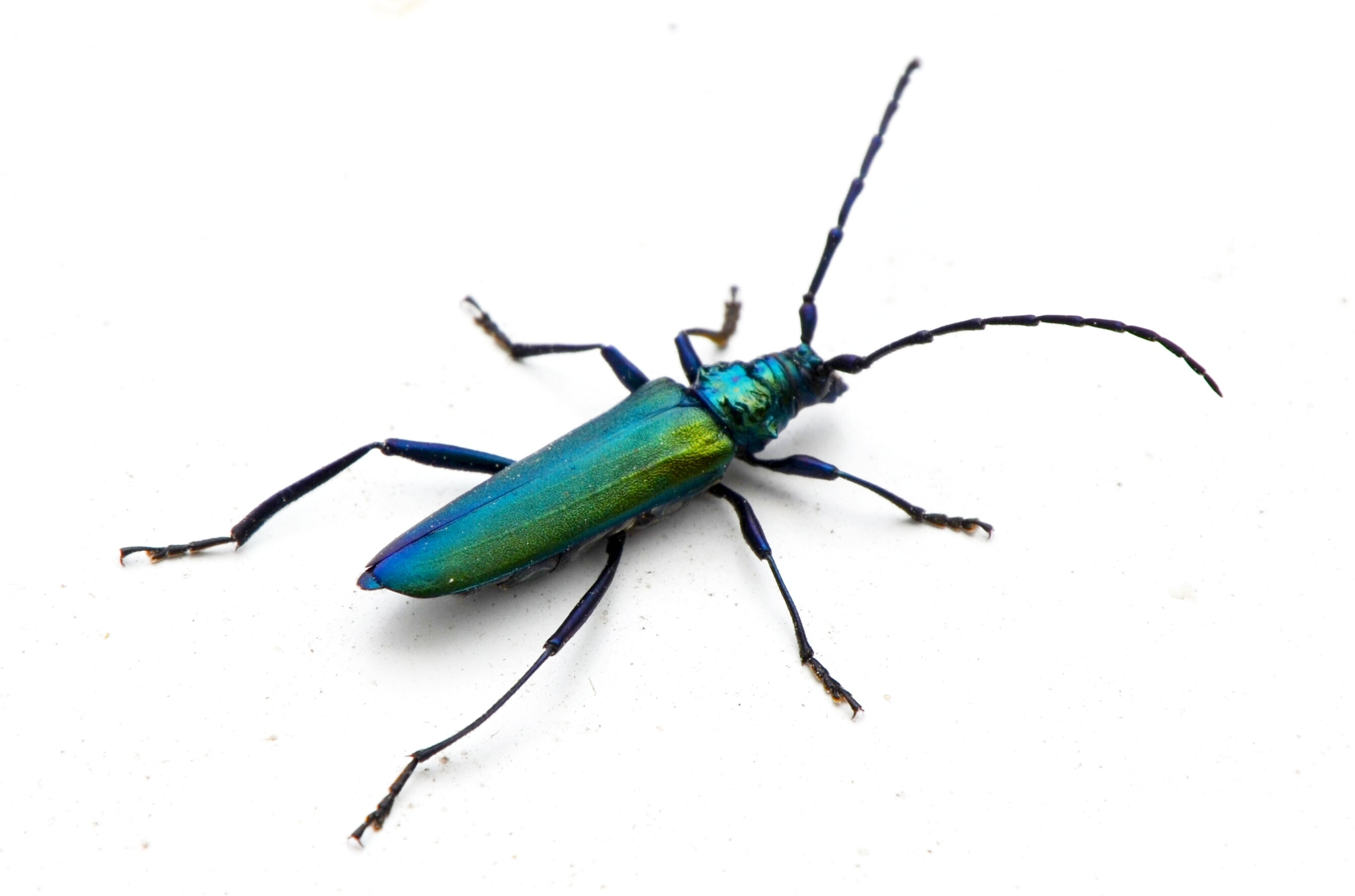
Musk beetle (Aromia moschata)

== Subspecies ==
- Aromia moschata ambrosiaca Steven & Sherman, 1809
- Aromia moschata cruenta Bogatschev, 1962
- Aromia moschata jankovskyi Danilevsky, 2007
- Aromia m. moschata (Linnaeus, 1758)
- Aromia moschata orientalis Plavilstshikov, 1932
- Aromia moschata sumbarensis Danilevsky, 2007
- Aromia moschata vetusta Jankovsky, 1934
