= (+)-Sabinene 3-hydroxylase =

Enzyme

Identifiers
- EC no.: 1.14.13.153

Databases
- IntEnz: IntEnz view
- BRENDA: BRENDA entry
- ExPASy: NiceZyme view
- KEGG: KEGG entry
- MetaCyc: metabolic pathway
- PRIAM: profile
- PDB structures: RCSB PDB PDBe PDBsum
Search
- PMC: articles
- PubMed: articles
- NCBI: proteins

(+)-Sabinene 3-hydroxylase (EC 1.14.13.153) is an enzyme with systematic name (+)-sabinene,NADPH:oxygen oxidoreductase (3-hydroxylating). It catalyses the following chemical reaction

(+)-sabinene
+ NADPH + H^{+}
O_{2}
H_{2}O
(+)-sabinol
+ NADP^{+}

The four substrates of this enzyme are (+)-sabinene, reduced nicotinamide adenine dinucleotide phosphate (NADPH), oxygen, and a proton. It products are (+)-sabinol, oxidised NADP^{+}, and water.

The enzyme is a monooxygenase isolated from Salvia officinalis (common sage). Its active centre is a cytochrome P450.
