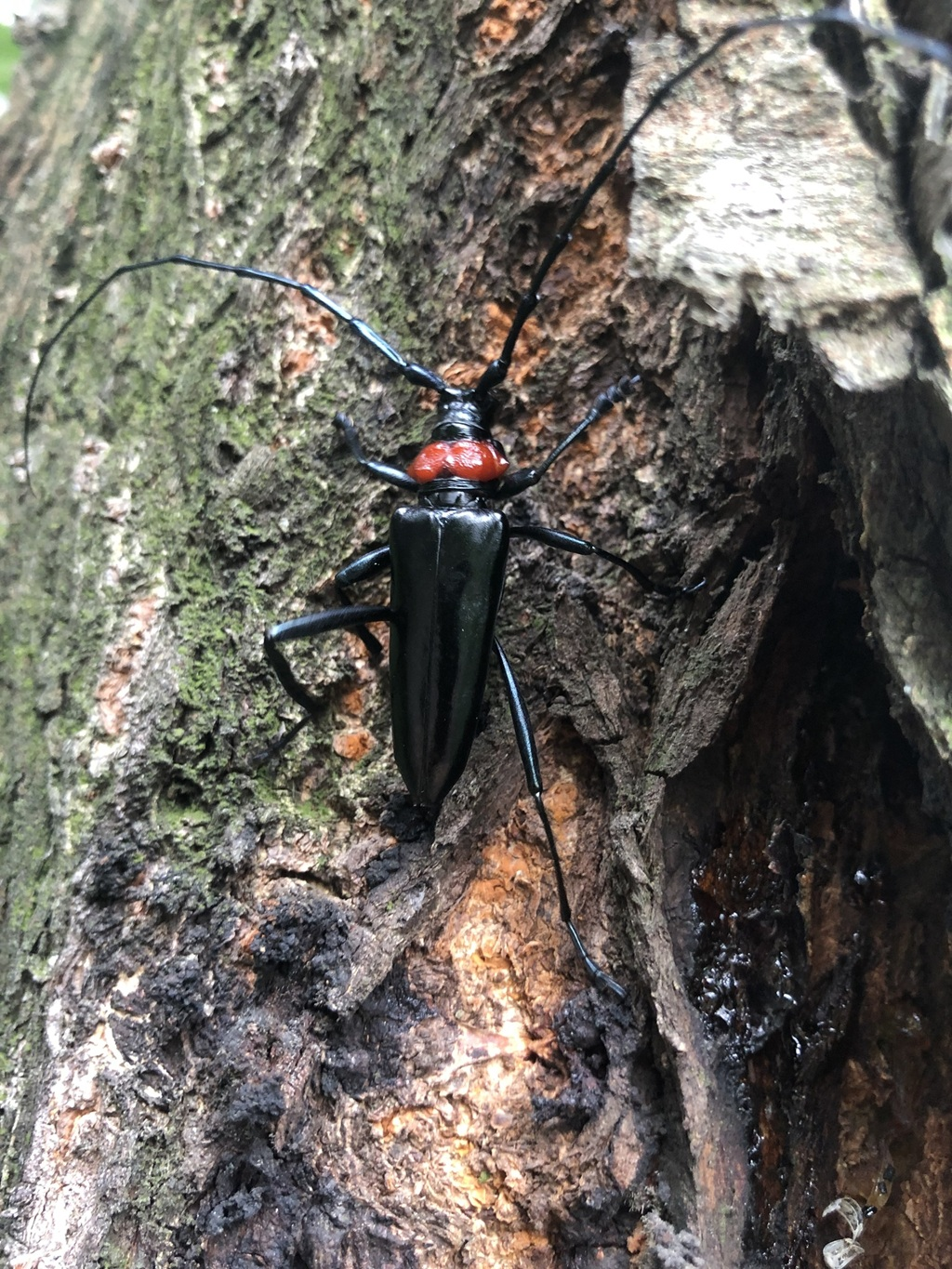

Scientific classification
- Kingdom: Animalia
- Phylum: Arthropoda
- Clade: Pancrustacea
- Class: Insecta
- Order: Coleoptera
- Suborder: Polyphaga
- Infraorder: Cucujiformia
- Family: Cerambycidae
- Genus: Aromia
- Species: A. bungii

Binomial name
- Aromia bungii (Faldermann, 1835)

Synonyms
- Cerambyx bungii Faldermann, 1835; Aromia cyanicornis Guérin-Méneville, 1844; Callichroma ruficolle Redtenbacher, 1868

= Aromia bungii =

Species of beetle

Aromia bungii, commonly known as red-necked longhorn beetle, is a species of wood-boring beetle belonging to the family of longhorn beetles (Cerambycidae) that is native to eastern Asia. It was described by the entomologist Franz Faldermann in 1835 from Mongolia. It is common and native in different parts of China and South Korea and has been reported from the neighboring parts of Vietnam, North Korea, far eastern Russia and Japan. Further, the beetle is invasive in Europe (first record in 2010) and Japan (first record in 2012), spreading with wood-packing materials and through infested nursery plants. As of 2025, infestations in Europe have been reported from different regions in Italy as well as from southern Germany. A. bungii is a pest of live fruit and ornamental trees from the genus Prunus (Rosaceae), in particular peach, cherry, plum and apricot trees. The larval stages feed mainly under the bark on the sapwood but can also bore into the heartwood. The infestations can cause considerable damage, with heavy attacks resulting in a reduction of fruits and growth, up to tree death. More than 50% of the trees in an orchard may be affected. For preventing infestations, painting a lime-sulfur mixture or other substances on the bark is practiced. Other management options include the use of pesticides and traps. In invaded areas, monitoring and quarantine procedures to prevent further spread is important. The adult beetles are around 25-35 mm long and can be recognized by the combination of the reddish pronotum and shiny black elytra. The red pronotum by itself is not sufficient for identification as some forms of the related species Aromia moschata also have a red pronotum. The females lay eggs in cracks in the bark, mainly at the base of the trees. Upon emerging from the eggs, the larvae tunnel into the trunk. They are whitish and reach a length of up to 50 mm when fully mature.

== Distribution ==
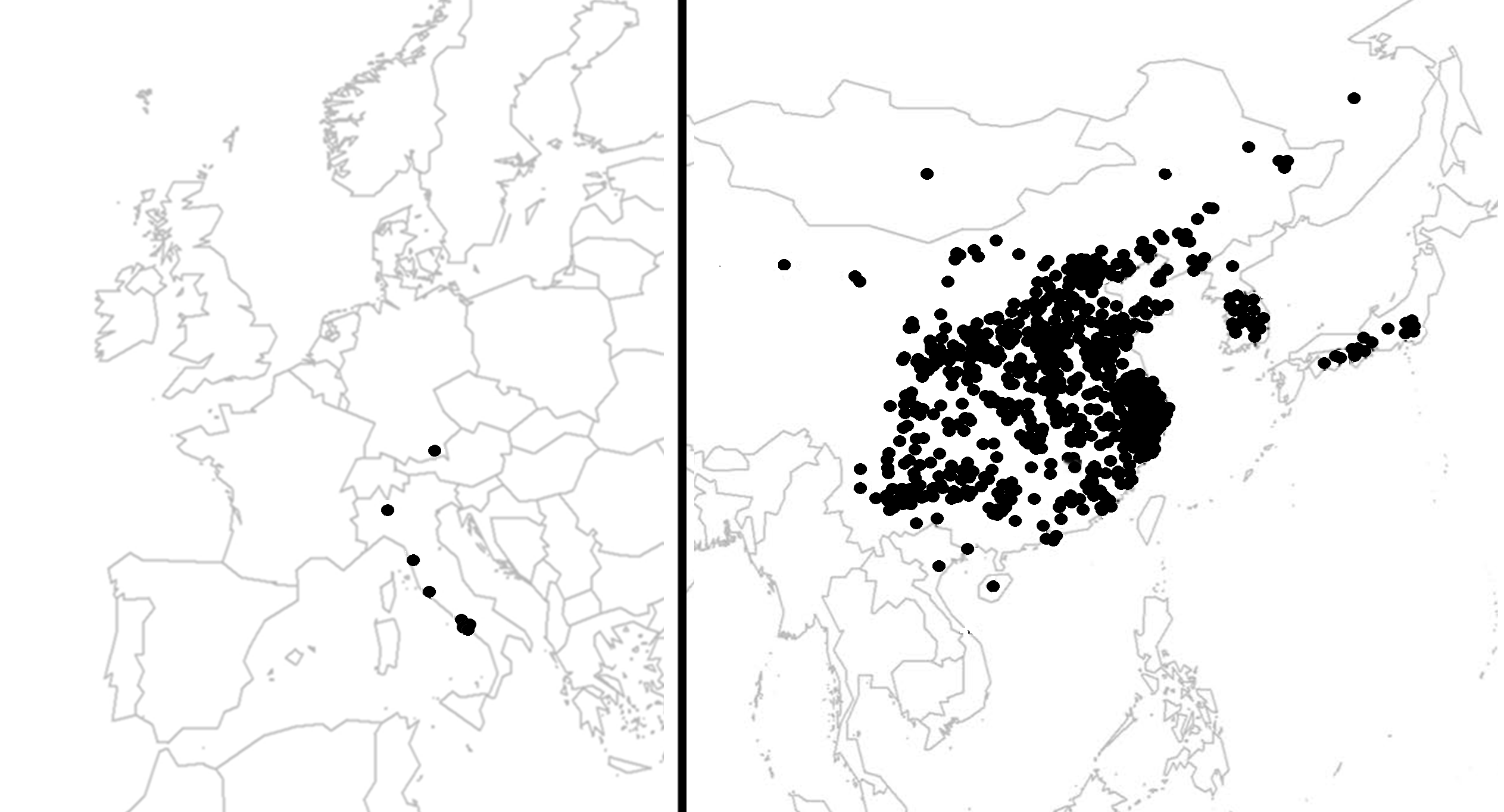
Distribution records of Aromia bungii in Europe (left) and in Asia (right). Click on image to enlarge it.

Aromia bungii is native to eastern Asia. It has been originally described from Mongolia. The type localities of the synonym species Aromia cyanicornis and Callichroma ruficolle are China and Hong Kong respectively. The beetle has been most often reported from different parts of eastern China and from South Korea. Additional records are from the neighboring countries Vietnam, North Korea and far eastern Russia.

In Japan, Aromia bungii was first discovered in 2012, in southern parts of the Tokai region of Honshu Island. Subsequent surveys between 2015 and 2019 established the presence of the beetle in four other regions of Honshu Island: northern Kanto, southern Saitama, western Tokyo and western Kansai, as well as in Itano in the north-eastern part of Shikoku Island. The beetle populations in these six regions were all geographically separated and DNA analyses suggested that the populations originated from multiple introductions.

In Europe, Aromia bungii was first detected near Naples in the Campania region of southern Italy in 2010. It spread in that region, causing an outbreak and is still spreading in Italy. In 2013, it was reported from an area near Milan in northern Italy. In addition, in 2020, it was found in the Lazio region of Italy, not far from Rome, and in 2023 further north in the Tuscany region. In southern Germany, an infestation of A. bungii was discovered in 2011 near Rosenheim (Bavaria).

Analyses of current and future distribution patterns in relation to environmental factors suggest that many parts of China and some parts of eastern Asia are very suitable for Aromia bungii, but that areas in other regions are less suitable. However, there is uncertainty about possible future distribution patterns due to insufficient physiological data on temperature thresholds for development and mortality. Therefore, larger areas in temperate and subtropical regions might possibly be at risk of invasion by this pest.

== Description ==
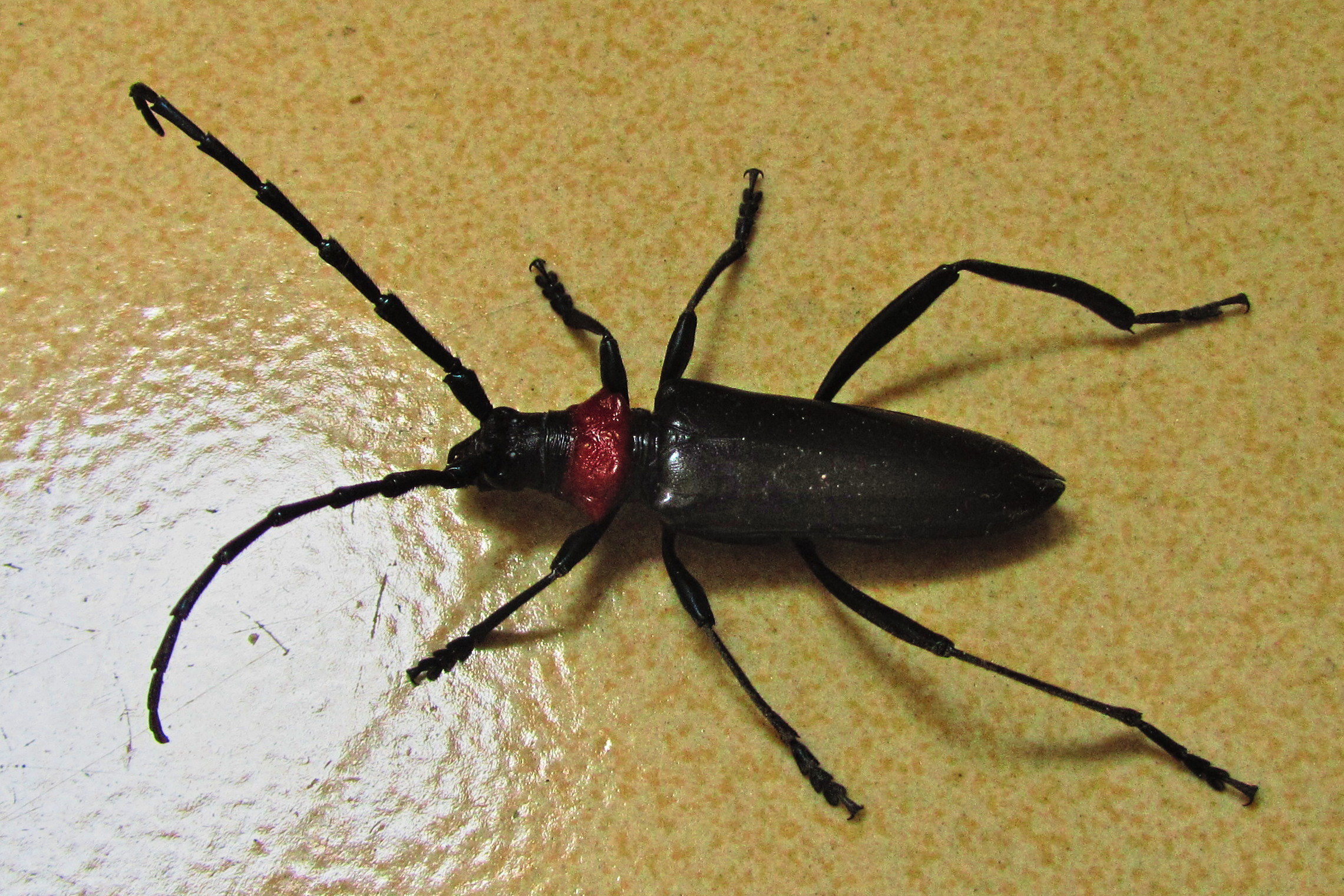
Aromia bungii adult beetle

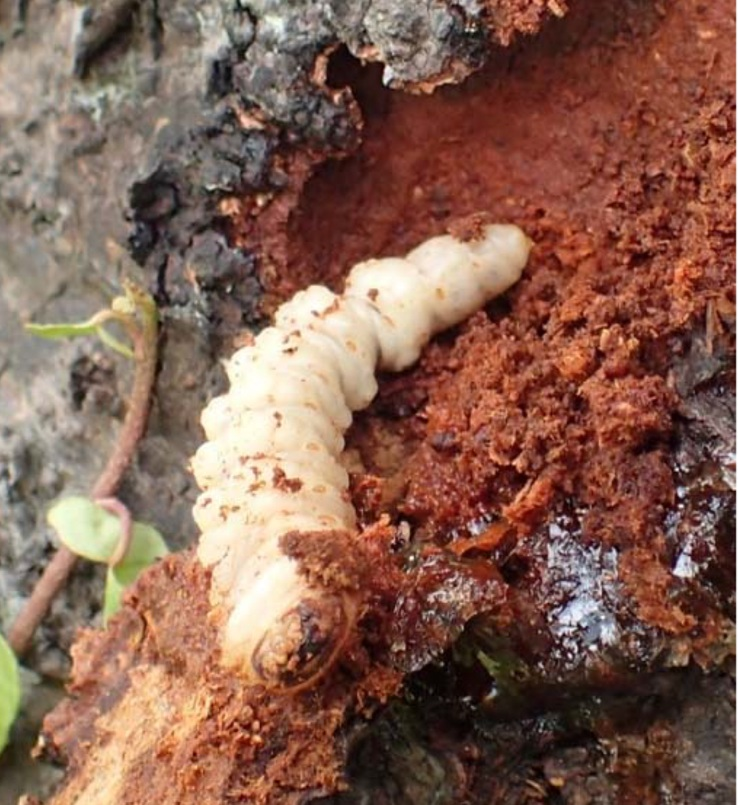
Aromia bungii larva, exposed by removing the bark of a cherry tree in Japan

Adult beetles of Aromia bungii are typically around 30 mm long, excluding the antennae and the long legs. The size may range from 20 to 40 mm. They can be recognized by the combination of shiny black elytra and a red pronotum. However, there is also a color form which is entirely black. The most similar species is Aromia moschata which is widespread in Europe and may also include color forms with a red pronotum. The most reliable difference between both species is the structure and color of the elytra. The elytra of A. bungii are black, shiny and smooth, whereas those of A. moschata have an uneven surface with a metallic greenish, bluish or reddish-brown (rarely black) color. In addition, the elytra of A. moschata have two fine ridges that extend from the base to the distal half of the wing.

Other diagnostic features of Aromia bungii adults include the antennae which have a furrow on the first segment and ridges on the third and subsequent segments. The antennae are about as long as the body in females, but almost double as long as the body in males. The pronotum surface is not even and has several swellings and humps, further, its sides are pointed. The tibiae of the hind legs are flattened at the sides.

For quarantine reasons, the identification of the larval stages of Aromia bungii is important in regions where populations are invasive. The head of the larvae has some distinctive features which separate them from the larvae of other longhorn beetles. However, the corresponding features of some closely related species like A. moschata are unknown. Moreover, A. bungii has two forms of larvae (form “a” and form “b”) which differ considerably in their morphology, for example in their size, shape and in the structure of the mandibles. For these reasons, molecular identification is recommended for larvae. This is even possibly using the frass ejected by the larvae from the attacked trees. In addition, the host plant is an important criterion which can separate A. bungii from species like A. moschata. A. bungii develops on Prunus species and A. moschata on Salix, Populus, Alnus and Acer trees.

== Biology ==
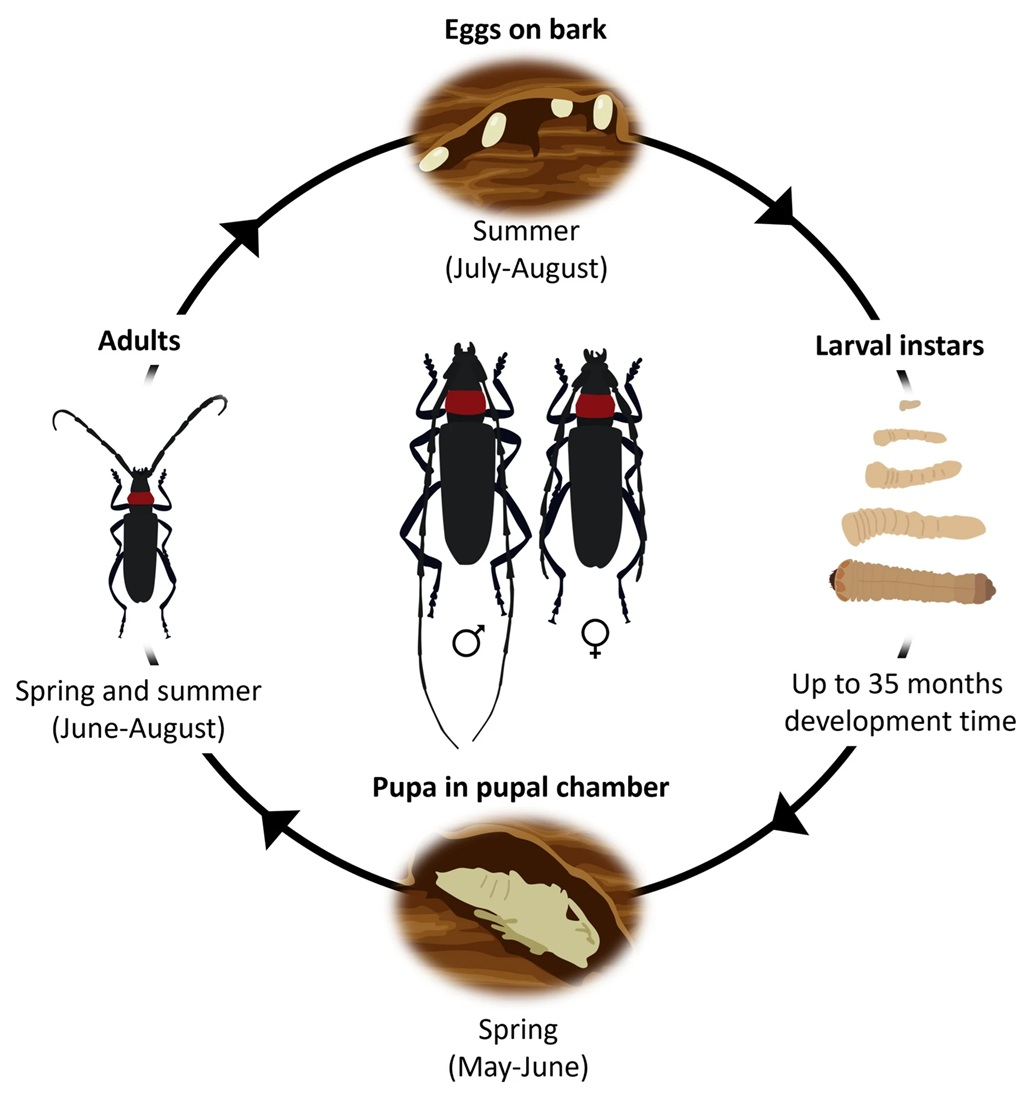
Aromia bungii life cycle: Eggs are laid on the bark, larvae develop in the sapwood, sometimes over several years, pupal and adult stages follow.

The life cycle of Aromia bungii can extend over several years, depending on the environmental conditions. During the summer, females lay eggs in cracks of the bark of live Prunus trees. The main host plants are cherry, peach, plum and apricot. Both fruit trees and ornamental Prunus species are used as well as some other related plants from the family Rosaceae. Records of host trees from genera outside this family like poplars or olives are doubtful. The larvae hatch from the eggs after approximately 10 days and then bore into the phloem (sapwood). The galleries they create are up to 12 mm wide and the feeding activities result in the accumulation of a considerable amount of frass which is pushed out of the tree by the larvae. The presence of this frass at the bottom of Prunus trees is a useful sign of infestation during surveys for this pest.

The larvae initially feed on the phloem, but later also infests the xylem and often pupate there. The development of the larvae in the trunks involves several larval stages, the exact number is unknown. The mature larvae reach a length of 40 to 50 mm. In warmer regions like southern China, the larval development may be completed by spring of the following year when the larvae pupate and the adults emerge by early summer. However, in more temperate regions like central and northern China, one life cycle lasts for 2 or 3 years and larvae overwinter in those regions.

The adults live for one or two months and a female lays several hundred eggs during its lifetime. Adults feed on mature and decaying fruits and are attracted to vinegar. In the laboratory, they can be kept alive by feeding them with pieces of apples. Adults can fly, but their dispersal ability is likely limited to short distances up to several hundred meters per year.

== Pheromones ==
In wind tunnel experiments, female Aromia bungii have been found to be attracted to live male beetles, suggesting a male-produced pheromone. Subsequently, a male-produced sex-aggregation pheromone was identified with the chemical structure (E)-2-cis-6,7-epoxynonenal. This pheromone attracts both males and females. The pheromone can be synthesized, is produced commercially and has been used for monitoring new A. bungii infestations. However, it lasts for only 1 or 2 weeks under field conditions. In addition, a female-produced sex pheromone component, (R)-(+)-citronellal, has been reported that attracts males in Y-tube laboratory assays.

== Impact, quarantine and management ==
Aromia bungii is regarded as one of the most important pests of fruit trees in China, due to the destructive feeding activities of the larvae. If a host tree is infested repeatedly, it will weaken, produce fewer fruits and often die. The outbreak in southern Italy has killed several hundred fruit trees. In China, especially peach trees are affected and more than half of all peach trees in an orchard may be infested. In the EU, A. bungii is officially regarded as having high priority for control operations.

It is assumed that human activity is responsible for long distance spread of Aromia bungii, considering the limited flight ability of the adult beetles. The two main transport routes are believed to be through infested wood like wooden packing materials and through infested nursery plants. For example in 2008, during inspections by plant health authorities in the UK, three adult A. bungii were found in wooden pallets sent by a Dutch supplier but suspected to be of Chinese origin.

Preventing the spread of invasive insect pests is most effective if strict quarantine operations are in place at possible points of entry like harbors, airports or border checkpoints. Once a pest has already been introduced into a country or region and breeding populations have established, eradication is very difficult and successes are rare. Control operations against invasive Aromia bungii populations in Japan and Europe are still ongoing, but primarily aimed at containment, meaning restricting its spread to new areas. This involves surveying Prunus trees in invaded areas for signs of A. bungii infestations like frass at the bottom of the trees. Once an attacked tree has been discovered, it is felled, cut into pieces and burned. In addition, pheromone traps are used to delimit the size of the infested areas. During survey and control operations in Germany several hundred infested and suspicious trees were identified and removed in an area of about 100 km^{2}, but the areas of infestation are much larger in Italy. A comprehensive outline of quarantine and control procedures has been provided by the UK Department for Environment, Food & Rural Affairs in 2019/2022.

In China, the most common control methods include physical cleaning of trees, manual removal of A. bungii stages and trunk whitening using a mixture of sulfur, lime and salt. Insecticide treatments are also recommended, including trunk injections. Further, various trapping methods have been described that reduce populations of adult beetles. Finally, a number of biological control agents against A. bungii larvae are known, including predators, parasitoids, fungal diseases and parasitic nematodes.

== Taxonomy ==
In 1833 Jean Guillaume Audinet-Serville described the genus Aromia, listing 2 species, Aromia moschata (Fabr.) and Aromia ambrosiaca (Stév.). The latter is now regarded as a subspecies of A. moschata. Shortly afterwards, in 1835, Faldermann described Cerambyx bungii, the basionym of Aromia bungii, and he might not have been aware of the new genus Aromia. In 1853, Cerambyx bungii was transferred to the closely related genus Callichroma and was finally assigned to the genus Aromia in 1890.

Two other species have been described which are now regarded as synonyms of Aromia bungii:

- Aromia cyanicornis, described by Guérin-Méneville in 1844 from China. It is all black and lacks the red pronotum of the common A. bungii. It is usually regarded as a color form of A. bungii, often referred to as Aromia bungii var. cyanicornis Guérin-Méneville 1844, or less often as a subspecies.
- Callichroma ruficolle, described by Redtenbacher in 1868 from Hong Kong. In his original description, Redtenbacher noted that the species is very similar to Callichroma bungii and is probably only a variety of that species, with one of the main differences being the color of the pronotum which was described as blood red for Callichroma ruficolle, but brown by Faldermann for Cerambyx bungii.
