= R. aromatica =

R. aromatica may refer to:

- Ravensara aromatica, the clove nutmeg, a plant species found in Madagascar
- Rhus aromatica, the fragrant sumac, a plant species native to Canada and the United States

== See also ==
- Aromatica
