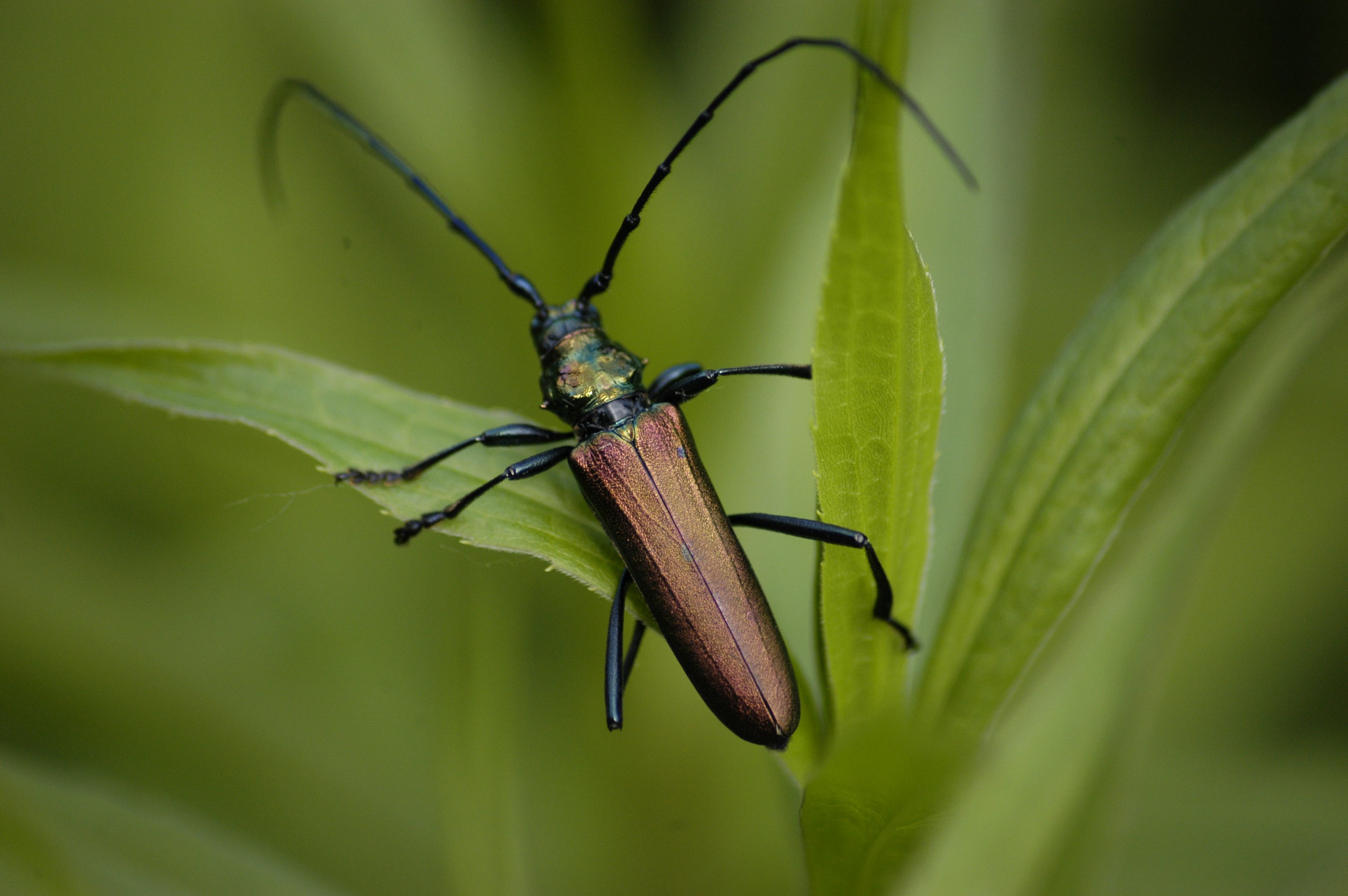
- Aromia moschata

Scientific classification
- Kingdom: Animalia
- Phylum: Arthropoda
- Class: Insecta
- Order: Coleoptera
- Suborder: Polyphaga
- Infraorder: Cucujiformia
- Family: Cerambycidae
- Subfamily: Cerambycinae
- Tribe: Callichromatini
- Genus: Aromia; Audinet-Serville, 1833

= Aromia =

Genus of beetle

Aromia is a genus of round-necked longhorn beetles of the subfamily Cerambycinae.

== Species ==
- Aromia bungii (Faldermann, 1835)
- Aromia malayana Hayashi, 1977
- Aromia moschata (Linnaeus, 1758)
