= Rose oxide =

Names
- IUPAC name Tetrahydro-4-methyl-2-(2-methylpropenyl)-2H-pyran

Identifiers
| CAS Number | 16409-43-1; 876-17-5 (−)-cis; 876-18-6 (−)-trans; 4610-11-1 (+)-cis; 5258-10-6 (+)-trans |
| 3D model (JSmol) | Interactive image; (−)-cis: Interactive image; (−)-trans: Interactive image; (+)-cis: Interactive image; (+)-trans: Interactive image |
| ChEBI | CHEBI:90075; CHEBI:90098 (−)-cis; CHEBI:90100 (−)-trans; CHEBI:90102 (+)-cis; CHEBI:90103 (+)-trans |
| ChemSpider | 25927; 1361574 (−)-cis; 5442476 (−)-trans; 4937413 (+)-cis; 1361573 (+)-trans |
| ECHA InfoCard | 100.036.763 |
| EC Number | 240-457-5 |
| PubChem CID | 27866; 1712087 (−)-cis; 7093102 (−)-trans; 6432154 (+)-cis; 1712086 (+)-trans |
| UNII | 4O51437J50; 08FS7459GK (−)-cis; XF860DJU9P (−)-trans; 7G7H98N31J (+)-cis; 0338MA4H3Y (+)-trans |
| CompTox Dashboard (EPA) | DTXSID1051771 |
- InChI: InChI=1S/C10H18O/c1-8(2)6-10-7-9(3)4-5-11-10/h6,9-10H,4-5,7H2,1-3H3 Key: CZCBTSFUTPZVKJ-UHFFFAOYSA-N; (−)-cis: InChI=1S/C10H18O/c1-8(2)6-10-7-9(3)4-5-11-10/h6,9-10H,4-5,7H2,1-3H3/t9-,10-/m1/s1 Key: CZCBTSFUTPZVKJ-NXEZZACHSA-N; (−)-trans: InChI=1S/C10H18O/c1-8(2)6-10-7-9(3)4-5-11-10/h6,9-10H,4-5,7H2,1-3H3/t9-,10+/m1/s1 Key: CZCBTSFUTPZVKJ-ZJUUUORDSA-N; (+)-cis: InChI=1S/C10H18O/c1-8(2)6-10-7-9(3)4-5-11-10/h6,9-10H,4-5,7H2,1-3H3/t9-,10-/m0/s1 Key: CZCBTSFUTPZVKJ-UWVGGRQHSA-N; (+)-trans: InChI=1S/C10H18O/c1-8(2)6-10-7-9(3)4-5-11-10/h6,9-10H,4-5,7H2,1-3H3/t9-,10+/m0/s1 Key: CZCBTSFUTPZVKJ-VHSXEESVSA-N
- SMILES: CC1CCOC(C1)C=C(C)C; (−)-cis: C[C@@H]1CCO[C@@H](C1)C=C(C)C; (−)-trans: C[C@@H]1CCO[C@H](C1)C=C(C)C; (+)-cis: C[C@H]1CCO[C@H](C1)C=C(C)C; (+)-trans: C[C@H]1CCO[C@@H](C1)C=C(C)C

Properties
| Chemical formula | C_{10}H_{18}O |
| Molar mass | 154.25 g/mol |
| Density | 0.875 g/cm^{3} |
| Boiling point | 230 °C (446 °F; 503 K) |
- Except where otherwise noted, data are given for materials in their standard state (at 25 °C [77 °F], 100 kPa). verify (what is ?) Infobox references

Rose oxide is a fragrance chemical found in roses and rose oil. It also contributes to the flavor of some fruits, such as lychee, and wines, such as Gewürztraminer.

== Chemistry ==
Rose oxide is an organic compound of the pyran class of monoterpenes. The compound has a cis- and a trans-isomer, each with a (+)- and (−)-stereoisomer, but only the (−)-cis isomer (odor threshold 0.5 ppb) is responsible for the typical rose (floral green) fragrance.

== Production ==
Rose oxide can be produced industrially beginning with photooxygenation of citronellol to give the allyl hydroperoxide which is then reduced with sodium sulfite to provide the diol. Ring-closure with sulfuric acid forms both the cis- and trans-isomers in equal amounts.
