= Elemene =

Elemenes
(+)-α-Elemene
(−)-β-Elemene
(−)-γ-Elemene
(−)-δ-Elemene

Names
- IUPAC names (+)-α: (S)-1-Isopropyl-6-methyl-3-(propan-2-ylidene)-6-vinylcyclohex-1-ene (−)-β: (1S,2S,4R)-1-Methyl-2,4-di(prop-1-en-2-yl)-1-vinylcyclohexane (−)-γ: (3R,4R)-1-Isopropyl-4-methyl-3-(prop-1-en-2-yl)-4-vinylcyclohex-1-ene (−)-δ: (3R,4R)-1-Isopropyl-4-methyl-3-(prop-1-en-2-yl)-4-vinylcyclohex-1-ene

Identifiers
CAS Number	11029-06-4 (unspecified isomer); 5951-67-7 ((+)-α); ((−)-β): 515-13-9; (±)-β: 33880-83-0; (−)-γ: 29873-99-2; (−)-δ: 20307-84-0
3D model (JSmol)	(+)-α: Interactive image; (±)-β: Interactive image; (−)-γ: Interactive image; (−)-δ: Interactive image
ChEBI	((−)-β): CHEBI:62855; (±)-β: CHEBI:62854
ChEMBL	((−)-β): ChEMBL448502
ChemSpider	(±)-β: 5293588; (−)-γ: 4937571
DrugBank	((−)-β): DB18097
KEGG	(±)-β: C17094
PubChem CID	80048 (α); ((−)-β): 6918391
UNII	(±)-β: 2QG8CX6LXD
CompTox Dashboard (EPA)	DTXSID10149196; ((−)-β): DTXSID60881211; (±)-β: DTXSID40865690
- InChI: ((−)-β): InChI=1S/C15H24/c1-7-15(6)9-8-13(11(2)3)10-14(15)12(4)5/h7,13-14H,1-2,4,8-10H2,3,5-6H3/t13-,14+,15-/m1/s1 Key: OPFTUNCRGUEPRZ-QLFBSQMISA-N
- SMILES: (+)-α: C[C@]1(C=C)C(C(C)C)=C/C(CC1)=C(C)/C; (±)-β: C[C@]1(C=C)[C@H](C(C)=C)C[C@H](C(C)=C)CC1; (−)-γ: C[C@@]1(C=C)[C@@H](C(C)=C)C=C(C(C)C)CC1; (−)-δ: CC(C)C1=C[C@H](C(C)=C)[C@@](C)(C=C)CC1

Properties
Chemical formula	C_{15}H_{24}
Molar mass	204.357 g·mol^{−1}
- Except where otherwise noted, data are given for materials in their standard state (at 25 °C [77 °F], 100 kPa). Infobox references

Elemenes are a group of closely related natural chemical compounds found in a variety of plants. The elemenes, which include α-, β-, γ-, and δ-elemene, are structural isomers of each other and are classified as sesquiterpenes. The elemenes contribute to the floral aromas of some plants, and are used as pheromones by some insects.

== Applications ==
β-Elemene in particular has attracted scientific interest because of its prevalence in a variety of medicinal plants, such as the Chinese medicinal herb Yu Jin (郁金, Curcuma wenyujin). Experiments performed in vitro show that β-elemene acts as a Rho kinase inhibitor, and has anti-proliferative effects toward some cancer cell types, indicating the possibility of its use in chemotherapy. Clinical trials in China have been conducted in which benefits for cancer treatment have been reported, and both liposome injection and oral emulsion forms of β-elemene have been approved by the China Food and Drug Administration (CFDA) as an adjuvant therapy for use in the treatment of various cancers. However, Western experts have been skeptical of claims for the safety and efficacy of β-elemene, with the trials being relatively small scale, and the Memorial Sloan–Kettering Cancer Center stating that "human trials conducted so far are of poor quality". A Cochrane Review of the available literature concluded that "there is no evidence from randomised controlled trials to confirm or refute the effectiveness of elemene as a treatment for lung cancer".
