= Bornylene =

Names
- Other names 1,7,7-Trimethylbicyclo[2.2.1]hept-2-ene, 2-bornene

Identifiers
CAS Number	464-17-5
3D model (JSmol)	Interactive image
ChemSpider	9652
PubChem CID	10047
UNII	F7WB27RKZC
CompTox Dashboard (EPA)	DTXSID20870545
- InChI: InChI=1S/C10H16/c1-9(2)8-4-6-10(9,3)7-5-8/h4,6,8H,5,7H2,1-3H3 Key: KUKRLSJNTMLPPK-UHFFFAOYSA-N
- SMILES: C1=CC2(C)CCC1C2(C)C

Properties
Chemical formula	C_{10}H_{16}
Molar mass	136.238 g·mol^{−1}
Appearance	colorless solid
Density	0.898 g/cm^{3}
Melting point	113 °C (235 °F; 386 K)
Boiling point	146–7 °C (295–45 °F; 419–280 K) 0.898
- Except where otherwise noted, data are given for materials in their standard state (at 25 °C [77 °F], 100 kPa). Infobox references

Bornylene is an organic compound classified as a terpenoid. It is a bicyclic alkene related structurally to the more common norbornene, which lacks the three methyl groups found in bornylene. It is chiral, but only one enantiomer is common in nature. It occurs widely as a component of the volatile organic compounds emitted by forests.

It can be derived synthetically from camphor via its tosylhydrazone.
