= Myrcenol =

Names
- Preferred IUPAC name 2-Methyl-6-methylideneoct-7-en-2-ol

Identifiers
CAS Number	543-39-5
3D model (JSmol)	Interactive image
ChemSpider	10510
ECHA InfoCard	100.008.040
PubChem CID	10975
UNII	X4XS5MYJ20
CompTox Dashboard (EPA)	DTXSID5027192
- InChI: InChI=1S/C10H18O/c1-5-9(2)7-6-8-10(3,4)11/h5,11H,1-2,6-8H2,3-4H3 Key: DUNCVNHORHNONW-UHFFFAOYSA-N; InChI=1/C10H18O/c1-5-9(2)7-6-8-10(3,4)11/h5,11H,1-2,6-8H2,3-4H3 Key: DUNCVNHORHNONW-UHFFFAOYAC
- SMILES: C=CC(=C)CCCC(C)(C)O

Properties
Chemical formula	C_{10}H_{18}O
Molar mass	154.253 g·mol^{−1}
Density	0.85 g/cm^{3}
Boiling point	217.64 °C (423.75 °F; 490.79 K)
- Except where otherwise noted, data are given for materials in their standard state (at 25 °C [77 °F], 100 kPa). verify (what is ?) Infobox references

Myrcenol is an organic compound, specifically a terpenoid. It is most notable as one of the fragrant components of lavender oil.

It is formed upon boiling hops (Humulus lupulus).

== Role in fragrance industry ==
Myrcenol is obtained synthetically from myrcene via hydroamination of the 1,3-diene followed by hydrolysis and Pd-catalysed removal of the amine. As a 1,3-diene, myrcenol undergoes Diels–Alder reactions with several dienophiles, such as acrolein, to give cyclohexene derivatives that are also useful fragrances.
