= 3,7-Dimethyl-1-octanol =

Names
- IUPAC name 3,7-Dimethyl-1-octanol
- Other names: Tetrahydrogeraniol; Dihydrocitronellol; Dimethyl octanol

Identifiers
CAS Number	106-21-8
3D model (JSmol)	Interactive image
ChEBI	CHEBI:195928
ChEMBL	ChEMBL3181881
ChemSpider	7504
ECHA InfoCard	100.003.068
EC Number	203-374-5
PubChem CID	7792
UNII	DPY9K1927C
CompTox Dashboard (EPA)	DTXSID5044360
- InChI: InChI=1S/C10H22O/c1-9(2)5-4-6-10(3)7-8-11/h9-11H,4-8H2,1-3H3 Key: PRNCMAKCNVRZFX-UHFFFAOYSA-N
- SMILES: CC(C)CCCC(C)CCO

Properties
Chemical formula	C_{10}H_{22}O
Molar mass	158.285 g·mol^{−1}
Density	0.828 g/cm^{3}
Boiling point	212 °C (414 °F; 485 K)
Solubility in water	practically insoluble
Solubility	soluble in most fixed oils and propylene glycol insoluble in glycerol
Solubility in ethanol	1 mL in 3 mL 70% alcohol
Refractive index (n_{D})	1.435-1.445

Hazards
- GHS labelling
Pictograms	(GHS07: Exclamation mark) (GHS09: Environmental hazard)
Signal word	Warning
Hazard statements	H315, H319, H411
Precautionary statements	P264, P264+P265, P273, P280, P302+P352, P305+P351+P338, P321, P332+P317, P337+P317, P362+P364, P391, P501
- Except where otherwise noted, data are given for materials in their standard state (at 25 °C [77 °F], 100 kPa). Infobox references

3,7-Dimethyl-1-octanol is a synthetically made and naturally occurring organic compound from the group of alcohols. 3,7-Dimethyl-1-octanol occurs naturally in citrus oils, honey, and rice (Oryza sativa).

== Properties ==
3,7-Dimethyl-1-octanol is a combustible, poorly flammable, colorless liquid with a floral odor that is practically insoluble in water.

== Synthesis ==
3,7-Dimethyl-1-octanol can be obtained by hydrogenation of geraniol, citronellol, or citronellal.

== Usage ==
3,7-Dimethyl-1-octanol is used as a fragrance and as an antimicrobial agent.
