= Nerol =

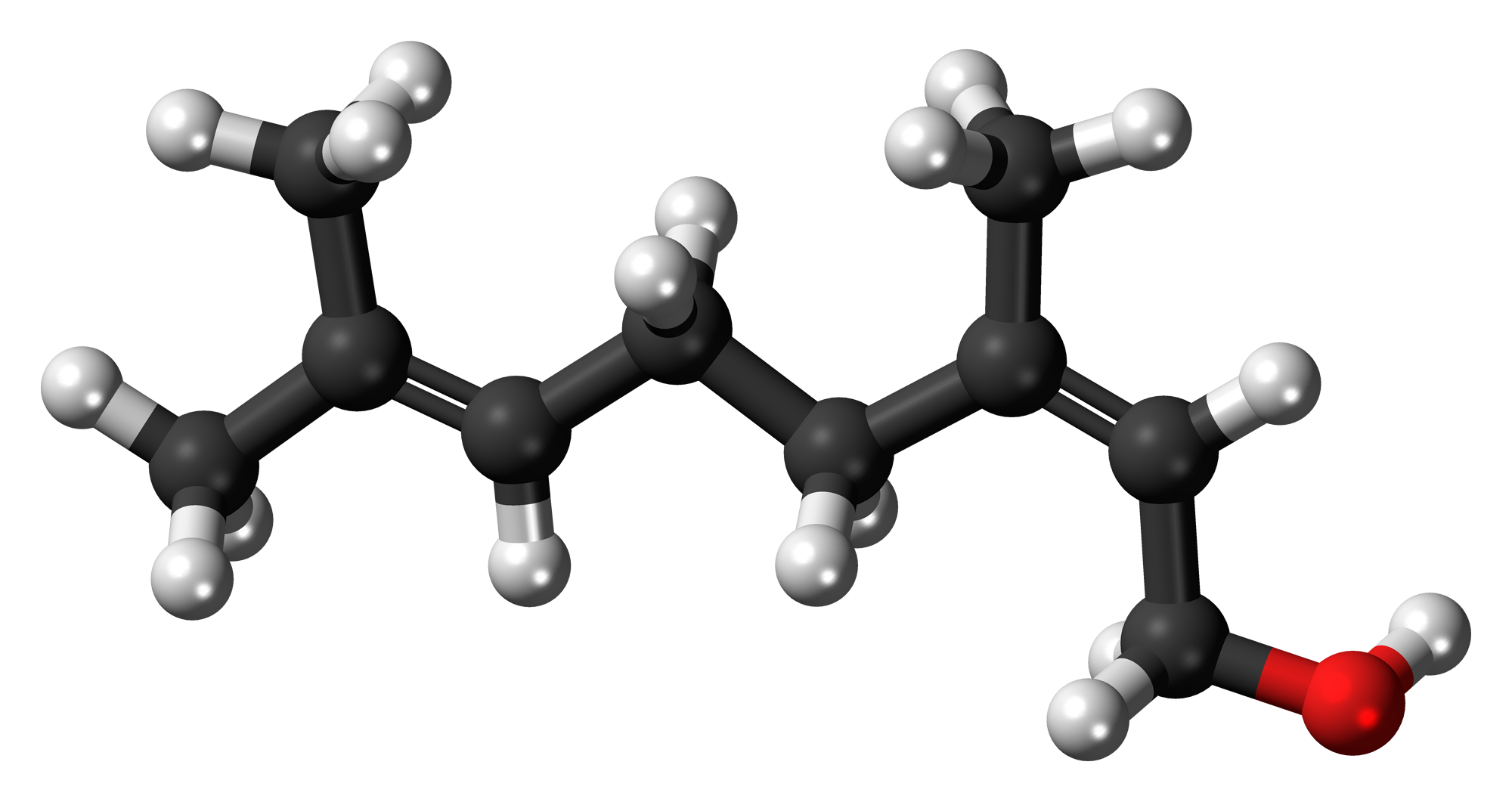

Names
- Preferred IUPAC name (2Z)-3,7-Dimethylocta-2,6-dien-1-ol

Identifiers
CAS Number	106-25-2
3D model (JSmol)	Interactive image
ChEBI	CHEBI:29452
ChEMBL	ChEMBL452683
ChemSpider	558917
ECHA InfoCard	100.003.072
KEGG	C09871
PubChem CID	643820
UNII	38G5P53250
CompTox Dashboard (EPA)	DTXSID3026728
- InChI: InChI=1S/C10H18O/c1-9(2)5-4-6-10(3)7-8-11/h5,7,11H,4,6,8H2,1-3H3/b10-7- Key: GLZPCOQZEFWAFX-YFHOEESVSA-N; InChI=1/C10H18O/c1-9(2)5-4-6-10(3)7-8-11/h5,7,11H,4,6,8H2,1-3H3/b10-7- Key: GLZPCOQZEFWAFX-YFHOEESVBO
- SMILES: OC\C=C(/CC/C=C(/C)C)C

Properties
Chemical formula	C_{10}H_{18}O
Molar mass	154.25 g/mol
Density	0.881 g/cm^{3}
Boiling point	224 to 225 °C (435 to 437 °F; 497 to 498 K) at 745 mmHg
- Except where otherwise noted, data are given for materials in their standard state (at 25 °C [77 °F], 100 kPa). verify (what is ?) Infobox references

Nerol is a monoterpenoid alcohol found in many essential oils such as lemongrass and hops. It was originally isolated from neroli oil, hence its name. This colourless liquid is used in perfumery. Like geraniol, nerol has a sweet rose odor but it is considered to be fresher. Esters and related derivatives of nerol are referred to as neryl, e.g., neryl acetate.

Isomeric with nerol is geraniol, which is its trans- or E-isomer. Nerol readily loses water to form a set of C10 compounds called dipentene. Nerol can be synthesized by pyrolysis of beta-pinene, which also affords myrcene. Hydrochlorination of myrcene gives a series of isomeric chlorides.

Nerol is used to create perfume compositions (to add a fresh citrus or rose nuance), to aromatize cosmetics and food products. Its aroma is described as sweet, natural, neroli, citrus, magnolia, fresh, floral, green, lemon, and lime.

== See also ==
- Citral
- Citronellol
- Geraniol
- Linalool
- Perfume allergy
