= Geraniol =

Monoterpenoid and alcohol that is the primary component of citronella oil

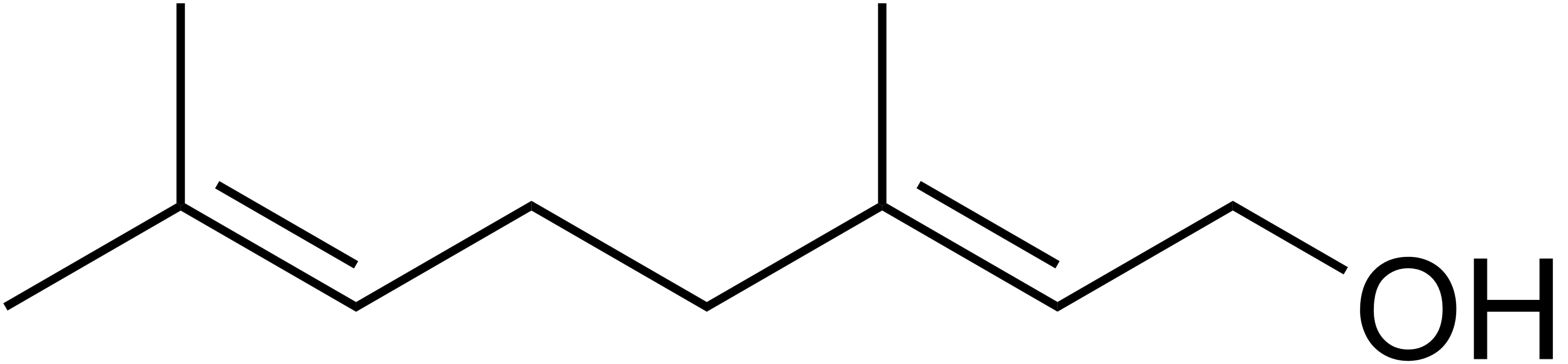
- Geraniol

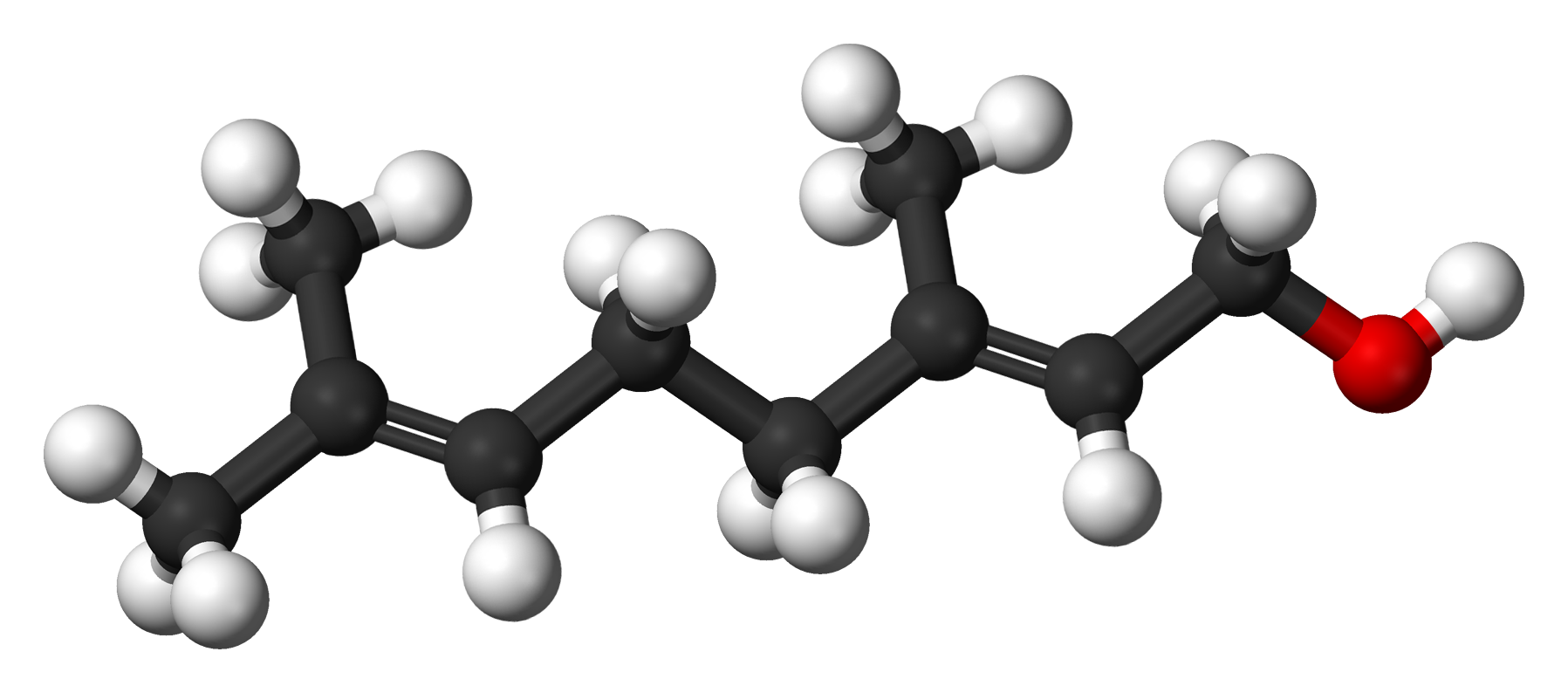

Names
- Preferred IUPAC name (2E)-3,7-Dimethylocta-2,6-dien-1-ol

Identifiers
CAS Number	106-24-1
3D model (JSmol)	Interactive image
ChEBI	CHEBI:17447
ChEMBL	ChEMBL25719
ChemSpider	13849989
DrugBank	DB14183
ECHA InfoCard	100.003.071
EC Number	203-377-1
IUPHAR/BPS	2467
KEGG	C01500
PubChem CID	637566
UNII	L837108USY
CompTox Dashboard (EPA)	DTXSID8026727
- InChI: InChI=1S/C10H18O/c1-9(2)5-4-6-10(3)7-8-11/h5,7,11H,4,6,8H2,1-3H3/b10-7+ Key: GLZPCOQZEFWAFX-JXMROGBWSA-N; InChI=1/C10H18O/c1-9(2)5-4-6-10(3)7-8-11/h5,7,11H,4,6,8H2,1-3H3/b10-7+ Key: GLZPCOQZEFWAFX-JXMROGBWBZ
- SMILES: CC(=CCC/C(=C/CO)/C)C

Properties
Chemical formula	C_{10}H_{18}O
Molar mass	154.253 g·mol^{−1}
Density	0.889 g/cm^{3}
Melting point	−15 °C (5 °F; 258 K)
Boiling point	230 °C (446 °F; 503 K)
Solubility in water	686 mg/L (20 °C)
log P	3.28

Hazards
NFPA 704 (fire diamond)	2 1 0
- Except where otherwise noted, data are given for materials in their standard state (at 25 °C [77 °F], 100 kPa). verify (what is ?) Infobox references

Geraniol is a monoterpenoid and an alcohol. It is the primary component of citronella oil and is a primary component of rose oil and palmarosa oil. It is a colorless oil, although commercial samples can appear yellow. It has low solubility in water, but it is soluble in common organic solvents.

== Uses and occurrence ==
Geraniol is used in medicine, perfumery, and food industry.

In addition to being found in rose oil, palmarosa oil, and citronella oil, it also occurs in small quantities in geranium, lemon, and many other essential oils. With a rose-like scent, it is commonly used in perfumes and in scents such as peach, raspberry, grapefruit, red apple, plum, lime, orange, lemon, watermelon, pineapple, and blueberry. The aroma is described as sweet, floral, fruity, rose, waxy, citrus, and citronella.

Geraniol is produced by the scent glands of honeybees to mark nectar-bearing flowers and locate the entrances to their hives. It is also commonly used as an insect repellent, especially for mosquitoes.

The scent of geraniol is reminiscent of, but chemically unrelated to, 2-ethoxy-3,5-hexadiene, also known as geranium taint, a wine fault resulting from fermentation of sorbic acid by lactic acid bacteria.

== Reactions ==
Geranyl pyrophosphate is an intermediate in the biosynthesis of other terpenes such as myrcene and ocimene. It also participates in the biosynthesis of many cannabinoids in the form of CBGA.

Geraniol undergoes a variety of reactions to give useful derivatives, it can be converted to the tosylate, which is a precursor to geranyl chloride which arises by the Appel reaction by the treatment of geraniol with triphenylphosphine and carbon tetrachloride. It can be oxidized to the aldehyde geranial. Hydrogenation of the two C=C bonds over a nickel catalyst gives tetrahydrogeraniol. In acidic solutions, geraniol is converted to the cyclic terpene α-terpineol.

== Health and safety ==
Geraniol is classified as D2B (Toxic materials causing other effects) using the Workplace Hazardous Materials Information System (WHMIS).

== History ==
Geraniol was first isolated in pure form in 1871 by the German chemist Oscar Jacobsen (1840–1889). Using distillation, Jacobsen obtained geraniol from an essential oil produced in India which was obtained from the so-called geranium grass. This essence, after which the compound was named, was a 50% cheaper substitute for the essence of the proper geranium flower with a similar, although less delicate, odor.

The chemical structure of geraniol was determined in 1919 by the French chemist Albert Verley (1867–1959).

== See also ==
- Citronellol
- Citral
- Nerol
- Rhodinol
- Geranyl pyrophosphate
- Geranylgeranyl pyrophosphate
- Linalool
- 8-Hydroxygeraniol
- Geraniol 8-hydroxylase
- Bergamottin
- Perfume allergy
