= Thujene =

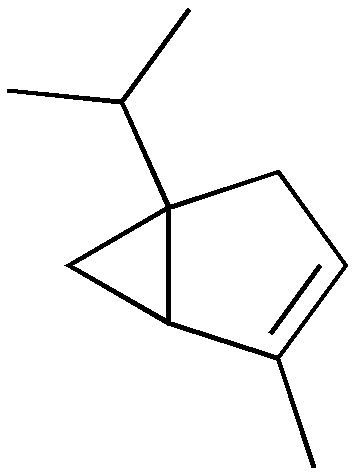

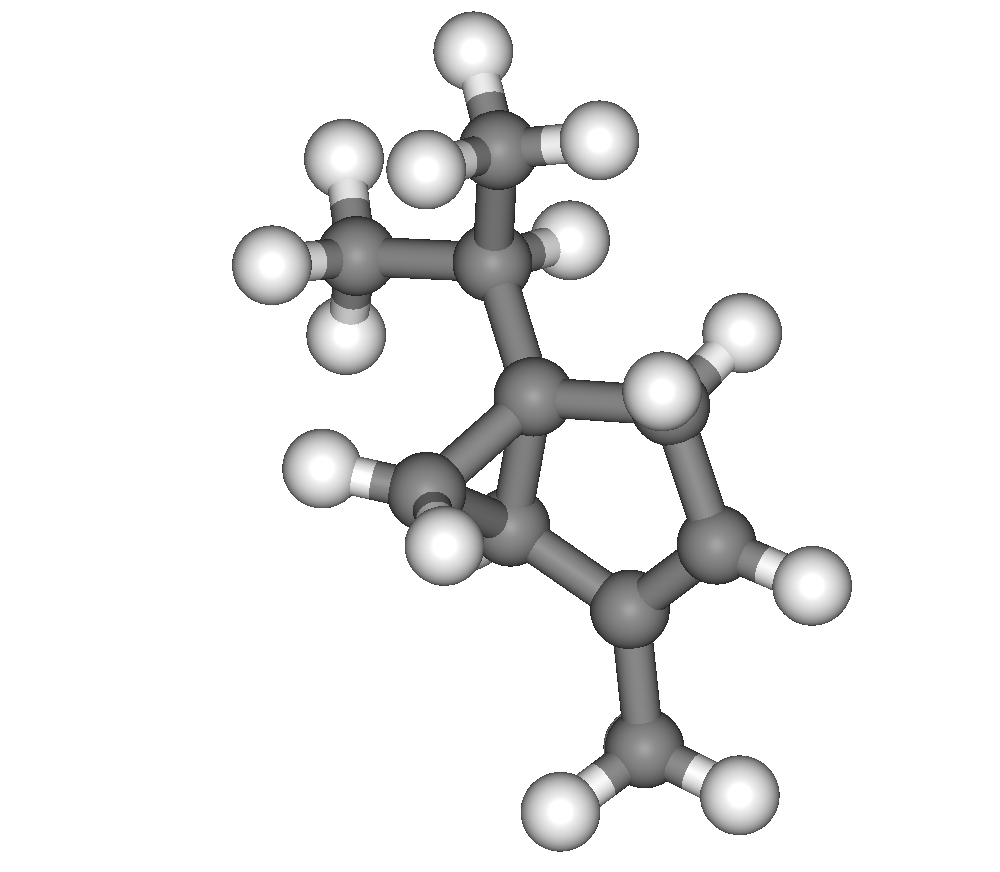

Names
- IUPAC name 1-Isopropyl-4-methylbicyclo[3.1.0]hex-3-ene
- Other names α-Thujene; 3-Thujene; Thujiene

Identifiers
CAS Number	2867-05-2 (+/-); 563-34-8 (+); 3917-48-4 (-)
3D model (JSmol)	Interactive image
ChEBI	CHEBI:50031
ChemSpider	16878
PubChem CID	17868
UNII	U9HIP11C7C (+/-); O47H0626QK (+); RN746W3HMX (-)
- InChI: InChI=1S/C10H16/c1-7(2)10-5-4-8(3)9(10)6-10/h4,7,9H,5-6H2,1-3H3 Key: KQAZVFVOEIRWHN-UHFFFAOYSA-N
- SMILES: CC1=CCC2(C(C)C)CC12

Properties
Chemical formula	C_{10}H_{16}
Molar mass	136.238 g·mol^{−1}
Boiling point	151 °C (304 °F; 424 K)
- Except where otherwise noted, data are given for materials in their standard state (at 25 °C [77 °F], 100 kPa). verify (what is ?) Infobox references

Thujene (or α-thujene) is a natural organic compound classified as a monoterpene. It is found in the essential oils of a variety of plants, and contributes pungency to the flavor of some herbs such as Summer savory.

The term thujene usually refers to α-thujene. A less common chemically related double-bond isomer is known as β-thujene (or 2-thujene). Another double-bond isomer is known as sabinene.

Chemical structure comparison

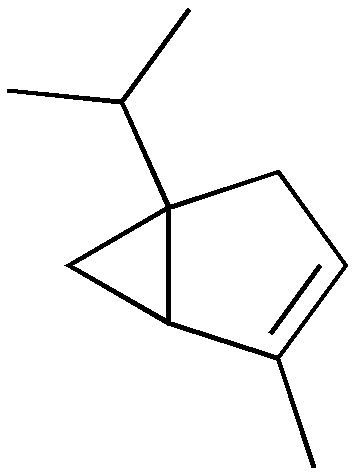
α-Thujene

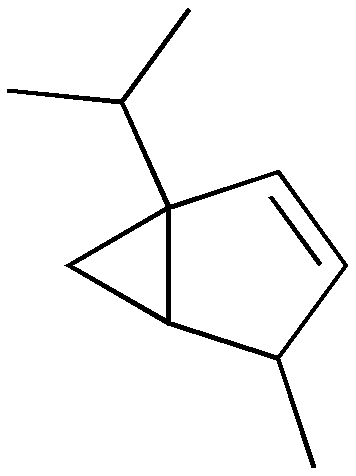
β-Thujene

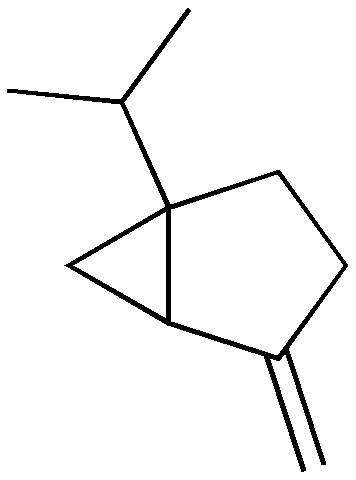
Sabinene

== See also ==
- Thujone
- Umbellulone, a thujene derivative
