= Monoterpene =

Unsaturated hydrocarbon

Monoterpenes are a class of terpenes that consist of two isoprene units and have the molecular formula C_{10}H_{16}. Monoterpenes may be linear (acyclic) or contain rings (monocyclic and bicyclic). Modified terpenes, such as those containing oxygen functionality or missing a methyl group, are called monoterpenoids. Monoterpenes and monoterpenoids are diverse. They have relevance to the pharmaceutical, cosmetic, agricultural, and food industries.

== Biosynthesis ==
Monoterpenes are derived biosynthetically from units of isopentenyl pyrophosphate, which is formed from acetyl-CoA via the intermediacy of mevalonic acid in the HMG-CoA reductase pathway. An alternative, unrelated biosynthesis pathway of IPP is known in some bacterial groups and the plastids of plants, the so-called MEP (methylerythritol phosphate, i.e. 2-methyl-D-erythritol-4-phosphate) pathway, which is initiated from C_{5} sugars. In both pathways, IPP is isomerized to DMAPP by the enzyme isopentenyl pyrophosphate isomerase.

Geranyl pyrophosphate is the precursor to monoterpenes (and hence monoterpenoids). Elimination of the pyrophosphate group from geranyl pyrophosphate leads to the formation of acyclic monoterpenes such as ocimene and the myrcenes. Hydrolysis of the phosphate groups leads to the prototypical acyclic monoterpenoid geraniol. Additional rearrangements and oxidations provide compounds such as citral, citronellal, citronellol, linalool, and many others. Many monoterpenes found in marine organisms are halogenated, such as halomon.

== Main examples ==
Selected Monoterpenes and Monoterpenoids (Note: Notation is discussed at Stereochemistry#Visual_representations)

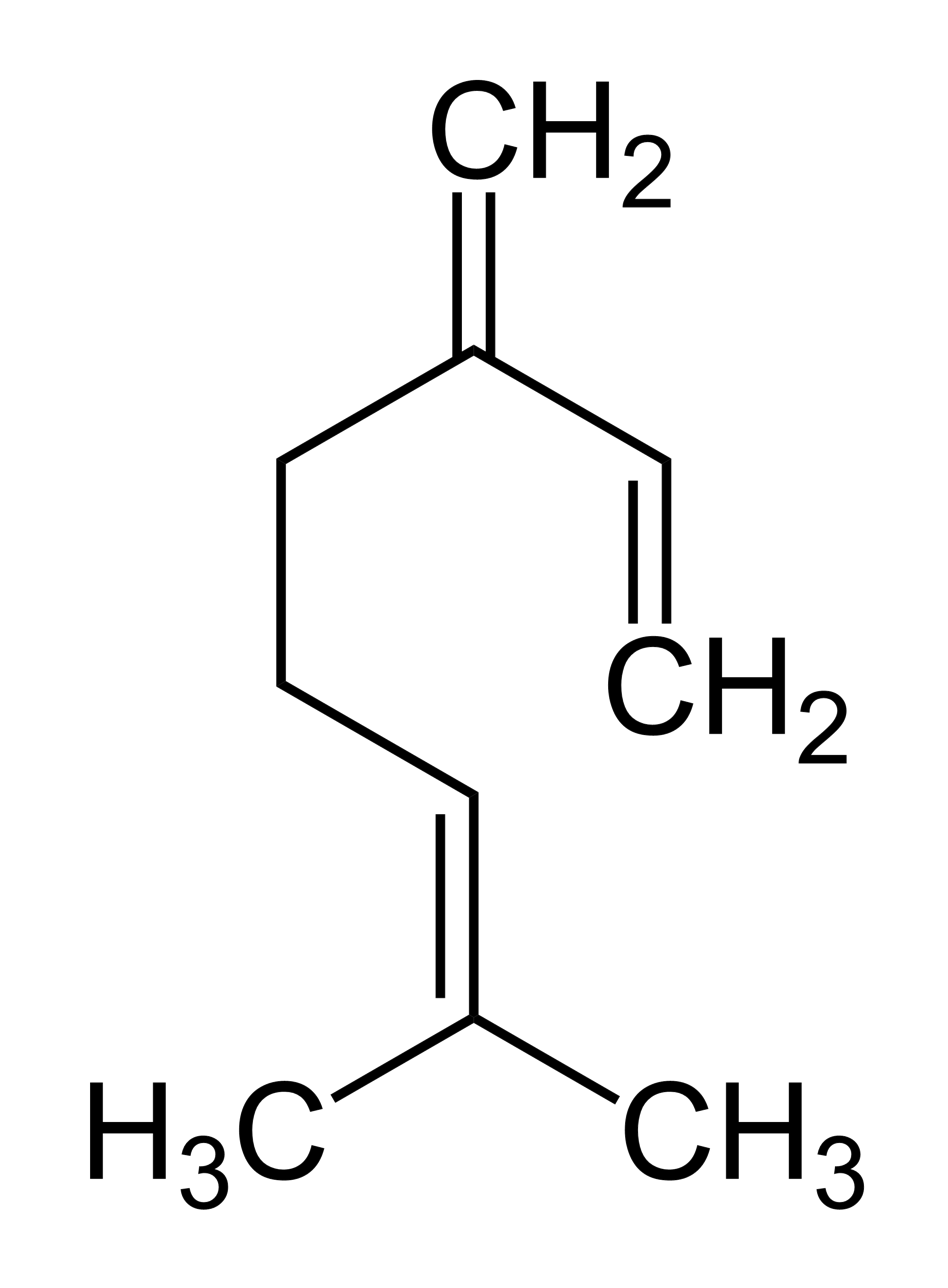
Myrcene is an acyclic monoterpene, an alkene hydrocarbon. (Note: CH2 and CH3 side chains are drawn explicitly in this diagram rather than being implied by omission, as is commonly seen.)

Menthol is a monocyclic monoterpenoid.

Limonene is a monocyclic monoterpene.

Carvone is a monoterpenoid.

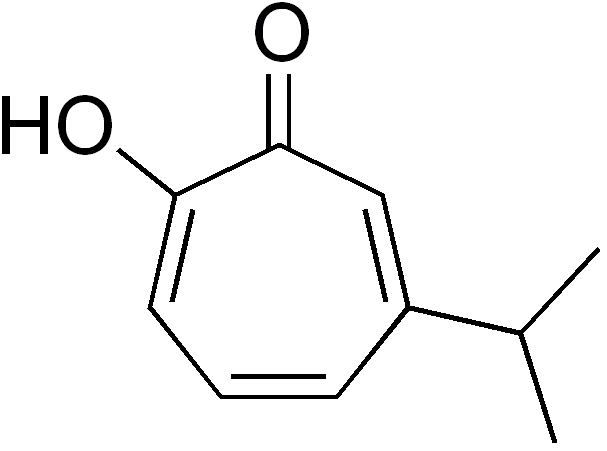
Hinokitiol is a monoterpenoid, a tropolone derivative.

Linalool is an acyclic monoterpenoid.

Bicyclic monoterpenes include carene, sabinene, camphene, and thujene. Camphor, borneol, eucalyptol and ascaridole are examples of bicyclic monoterpenoids containing ketone, alcohol, ether, and bridging peroxide functional groups, respectively. Umbellulone is another example of bicyclic monoterpene ketone.

== Natural roles ==
Monoterpenes are found in many parts of different plants, such as barks, heartwood, bark and leaves of coniferous trees, in vegetables, fruits and herbs. Essential oils are very rich in monoterpenes. Several monoterpenes produced by trees, such as linalool, hinokitiol, and ocimene have fungicidal and antibacterial activities and participate in wound healing. Some of these compounds are produced to protect the trees from insect attacks.

Monoterpenes are emitted by forests and form aerosols that are proposed to serve as cloud condensation nuclei (CCN). Such aerosols can increase the brightness of clouds and cool the climate.

Many monoterpenes have unique smell and flavor. For example, sabinene contributes to the spicy taste of black pepper, 3-carene gives cannabis an earthy taste and smell, citral has a lemon-like pleasant odor and contributes to the distinctive smell of citrus fruits, and thujene and carvacrol are responsible for the pungent flavors of summer savory and oregano, respectively.

Monoterpenes are considered allelochemicals.

== Uses ==
Many monoterpenes are volatile compounds and some of them are well-known fragrants found in the essential oils of many plants. For example, camphor, citral, citronellol, geraniol, grapefruit mercaptan, eucalyptol, ocimene, myrcene, limonene, linalool, menthol, camphene and pinenes are used in perfumes and cosmetic products. Limonene and perillyl alcohol are used in cleaning products.

Many monoterpenes are used as food flavors and food additives, such as bornyl acetate, citral, eucalyptol, menthol, hinokitiol, camphene and limonene. Menthol, hinokitiol and thymol are also used in oral hygiene products. Thymol also has antiseptic and disinfectant properties.

Volatile monoterpenes produced by plants can attract or repel insects, thus some of them are used in insect repellents, such as citronellol, eucalyptol, limonene, linalool, hinokitiol, menthol and thymol.

Ascaridole, camphor and eucalyptol are monoterpenes that have pharmaceutical use.

== Health effects ==
A study suggests that a range of floor cleaners with certain monoterpenes may cause indoor air pollution equivalent or exceeding the harm to respiratory tracts when the time is spent near a busy road. This is due to ozonolysis of monoterpenes like limonene leading to the production of atmospheric SOA. Another study suggests monoterpenes substantially affect ambient organic aerosol with uncertainties regarding environmental effects. In a review, scientists concluded that they hope that these "substances will be extensively studied and used in more and more in medicine". A 2013 study found that "Based on adverse effects and risk assessments, d-limonene may be regarded as a safe ingredient. However, the potential occurrence of skin irritation necessitates regulation of this chemical as an ingredient in cosmetics." According to a review, several studies showed "that some monoterpenes (e.g., pulegone, menthofuran, camphor, and limonene) and sesquiterpenes (e.g., zederone, germacrone) exhibited liver toxicity" and that i.a. intensive research on terpenes toxicity is needed.

== See also ==
- Terpene
- Terpenoid
- Diterpene
- Sesquiterpene
