= 3-Carene =

- Carene

Names
- Preferred IUPAC name 3,7,7-Trimethylbicyclo[4.1.0]hept-3-ene
- Other names Δ^{3}-Carene; Car-3-ene

Identifiers
CAS Number	13466-78-9
3D model (JSmol)	Interactive image
Beilstein Reference	1902767
ChEBI	CHEBI:7
ChEMBL	ChEMBL506854
ChemSpider	10660720
ECHA InfoCard	100.033.367
EC Number	236-719-3
Gmelin Reference	663435
KEGG	C11382
PubChem CID	26049
UNII	H2M15SNR6N
UN number	2319
CompTox Dashboard (EPA)	DTXSID4047462
- InChI: InChI=1S/C10H16/c1-7-4-5-8-9(6-7)10(8,2)3/h6-8H,4-5H2,1-3H3 Key: KALFVDDBBPRATR-UHFFFAOYSA-N; InChI=1/C10H16/c1-7-4-5-8-9(6-7)10(8,2)3/h6-8H,4-5H2,1-3H3 Key: KALFVDDBBPRATR-UHFFFAOYAY
- SMILES: CC1=CCC2C(C1)C2(C)C

Properties
Chemical formula	C_{10}H_{16}
Molar mass	136.238 g·mol^{−1}
Density	0.86 g/cm^{3} (20 °C)
Boiling point	170–172 °C (338–342 °F; 443–445 K)

Hazards
- GHS labelling
Pictograms	(GHS02: Flammable) (GHS07: Exclamation mark) (GHS08: Health hazard) (GHS09: Environmental hazard)
Signal word	Danger
Hazard statements	H226, H304, H315, H317, H412
Precautionary statements	P210, P233, P240, P241, P242, P243, P261, P264, P272, P273, P280, P301+P310, P302+P352, P303+P361+P353, P321, P331, P332+P313, P333+P313, P362, P363, P370+P378, P403+P235, P405, P501
- Except where otherwise noted, data are given for materials in their standard state (at 25 °C [77 °F], 100 kPa). verify (what is ?) Infobox references

3-Carene is a bicyclic monoterpene consisting of fused cyclohexene and cyclopropane rings. It occurs as a constituent of turpentine, with a content as high as 42% depending on the source. Carene has a sweet and pungent odor, best described as a combination of fir needles, musky earth, and damp woodlands.

A colorless liquid, it is not water-soluble, but miscible with fats and oils. It is chiral, occurring naturally both as the racemate and enantio-enriched forms.

== Reactions and uses ==
Treatment with peracetic acid gives 3,4-caranediol. Pyrolysis over ferric oxide induces rearrangement, giving p-cymene. Carene is used in the perfume industry and as a chemical intermediate.

Because carene can be found in cannabis naturally, it can also be found in cannabis distillates. Greater concentrations of carene in a distillate give it an earthier taste and smell. 3-Carene is also present in mango, giving the fruit a characteristic pine-like flavor and aroma.
