= Sabinene =

- Sabinene

Names
- IUPAC name 4-methylene-1-(1-methylethyl)bicyclo[3.1.0]hexane

Identifiers
CAS Number	3387-41-5; 10408-16-9 (−); 2009-00-9 (+)
3D model (JSmol)	Interactive image
ChEBI	CHEBI:50027
ChEMBL	ChEMBL452687
ChemSpider	17769
ECHA InfoCard	100.020.194
KEGG	C16777
PubChem CID	18818
UNII	7D1TL44GPC; I223NX31W9 (−); XYL0G8758O (+)
CompTox Dashboard (EPA)	DTXSID70863164
- InChI: InChI=1S/C10H16/c1-7(2)10-5-4-8(3)9(10)6-10/h7,9H,3-6H2,1-2H3 Key: NDVASEGYNIMXJL-UHFFFAOYSA-N; InChI=1/C10H16/c1-7(2)10-5-4-8(3)9(10)6-10/h7,9H,3-6H2,1-2H3 Key: NDVASEGYNIMXJL-UHFFFAOYAW
- SMILES: C=C2C1CC1(C(C)C)CC2

Properties
Chemical formula	C_{10}H_{16}
Molar mass	136.23 g/mol
Density	0.844 g/cm^{3} at 20 °C
Boiling point	163 to 164 °C (325 to 327 °F; 436 to 437 K)
- Except where otherwise noted, data are given for materials in their standard state (at 25 °C [77 °F], 100 kPa). verify (what is ?) Infobox references

Sabinene is a natural bicyclic monoterpene with the molecular formula C_{10}H_{16}. It is isolated from the essential oils of a variety of plants including Marjoram, holm oak (Quercus ilex) and Norway spruce (Picea abies). It has a strained ring system with a cyclopentane ring fused to a cyclopropane ring.

Sabinene is one of the chemical compounds that contributes to the spiciness of black pepper and is a major constituent of carrot seed oil. It also occurs in tea tree oil at a low concentration. It is also present in the essential oil obtained from nutmeg, Laurus nobilis, and Clausena anisata.

== Biosynthesis ==
Sabinene, a bicyclic monoterpene, is present in the (+) and (−) enantiomers. It is biosynthesized from the common terpenoid precursor, geranyl pyrophosphate (GPP) that undergoes polycyclization catalyzed by sabinene synthase (SabS). GPP is formed from the terpenoid synthesis pathway with the starter units, isopentenyl pyrophosphate (IPP) and dimethylallyl pyrophosphate (DMAPP). The starter units, IPP and DMAPP, can be synthesized from either the mevalonate (MVA) or the methylerythritol 4-phosphate (MEP) pathway. With the head-to-tail condensation of IPP and DMAPP catalyzed by GPP synthase, GPP is formed. Sabinene synthase (SabS) then catalyzes the ionization and isomerization of GPP to form 3R-linalyl pyrophosphate. Further ionization and cyclization results in the formation of sabinene.

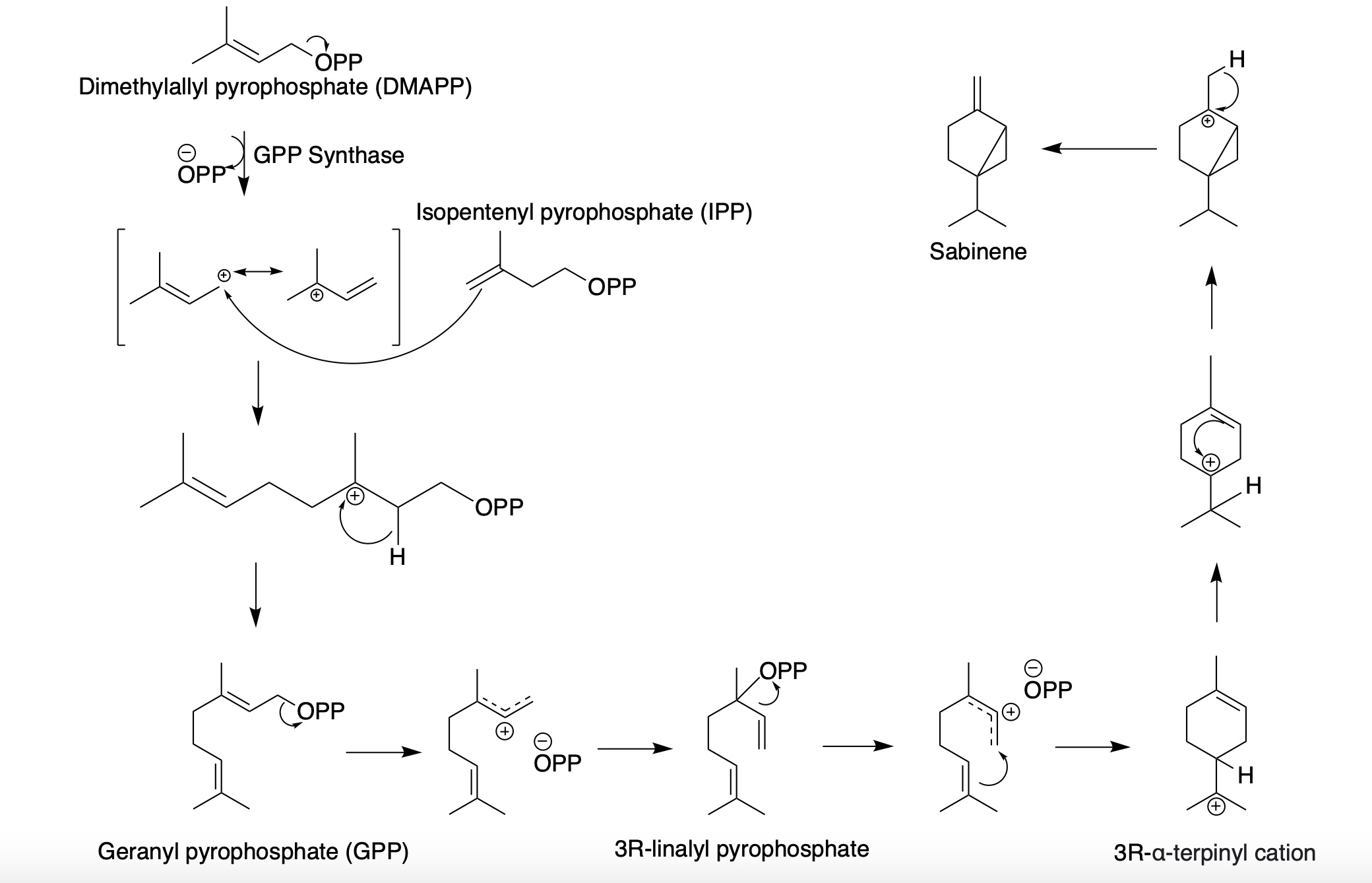
With the biosynthesis catalyzed by sabinene synthase, the precursor, geranyl pyrophosphate, undergoes isomerization and cyclization to form sabinene.

== See also ==
- Thujene, a double bond isomer of sabinene
