= Myrcene =

- Beta-myrcene, skeletal formula

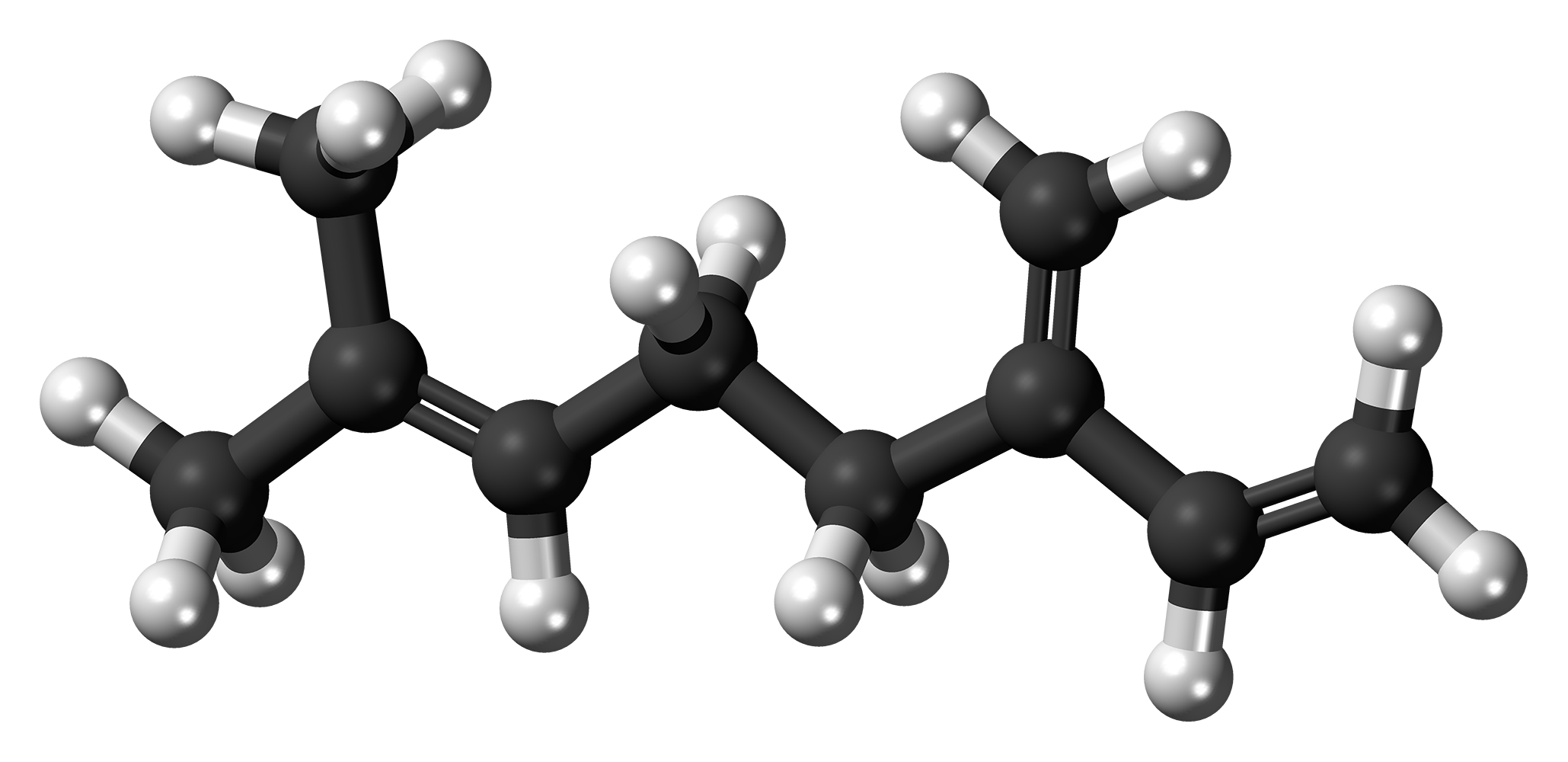
- Ball-and-stick model of the beta-myrcene molecule

Names
- Preferred IUPAC name 7-Methyl-3-methylideneocta-1,6-diene

Identifiers
CAS Number	123-35-3
3D model (JSmol)	Interactive image
ChEBI	CHEBI:17221
ChEMBL	ChEMBL455491
ChemSpider	28993
ECHA InfoCard	100.004.203
KEGG	C06074
PubChem CID	31253
UNII	3M39CZS25B
CompTox Dashboard (EPA)	DTXSID6025692
- InChI: InChI=1S/C10H16/c1-5-10(4)8-6-7-9(2)3/h5,7H,1,4,6,8H2,2-3H3 Key: UAHWPYUMFXYFJY-UHFFFAOYSA-N; InChI=1/C10H16/c1-5-10(4)8-6-7-9(2)3/h5,7H,1,4,6,8H2,2-3H3 Key: UAHWPYUMFXYFJY-UHFFFAOYAT
- SMILES: CC(=CCCC(=C)C=C)C

Properties
Chemical formula	C_{10}H_{16}
Molar mass	136.238 g·mol^{−1}
Density	0.794 g/cm^{3}
Melting point	< −10 °C (14 °F; 263 K)
Boiling point	166 to 168 °C (331 to 334 °F; 439 to 441 K)
- Except where otherwise noted, data are given for materials in their standard state (at 25 °C [77 °F], 100 kPa). verify (what is ?) Infobox references

Myrcene, or β-myrcene, is a monoterpene. A colorless oil, it occurs widely in essential oils. It can be obtained from Myrcia, from which it gets its name. It is an intermediate in the production of several fragrances. A less-common isomeric form, having one of the three alkene units in a different position, is α-myrcene.

== Production ==
Biosynthesis of myrcene from geranyl pyrophosphate.

Myrcene is often produced commercially by the pyrolysis (400 °C) of β-pinene, which is obtained from turpentine. It is rarely obtained directly from plants.

Plants biosynthesize myrcene via geranyl pyrophosphate (GPP), which isomerizes into linalyl pyrophosphate. An elimination reaction, releasing the pyrophosphate (OPP) and a proton, completes the conversion.

== Occurrence ==
It could in principle be extracted from any number of plants, such as verbena or wild thyme, the leaves of which contain up to 40% by weight of myrcene. Many other plants contain substantial amounts of myrcene. Some of these include cannabis, hops (Humulus lupulus), Houttuynia, lemon grass, mango, Myrcia, West Indian bay tree, and cardamom.

Myrcene is found in the South African Adenandra villosa (50%) and Brazilian Schinus molle (40%). It also occurs in Myrcia cuprea petitgrain (up to 48%), bay leaf, and juniper berry.

== Use in fragrance and flavor industries ==
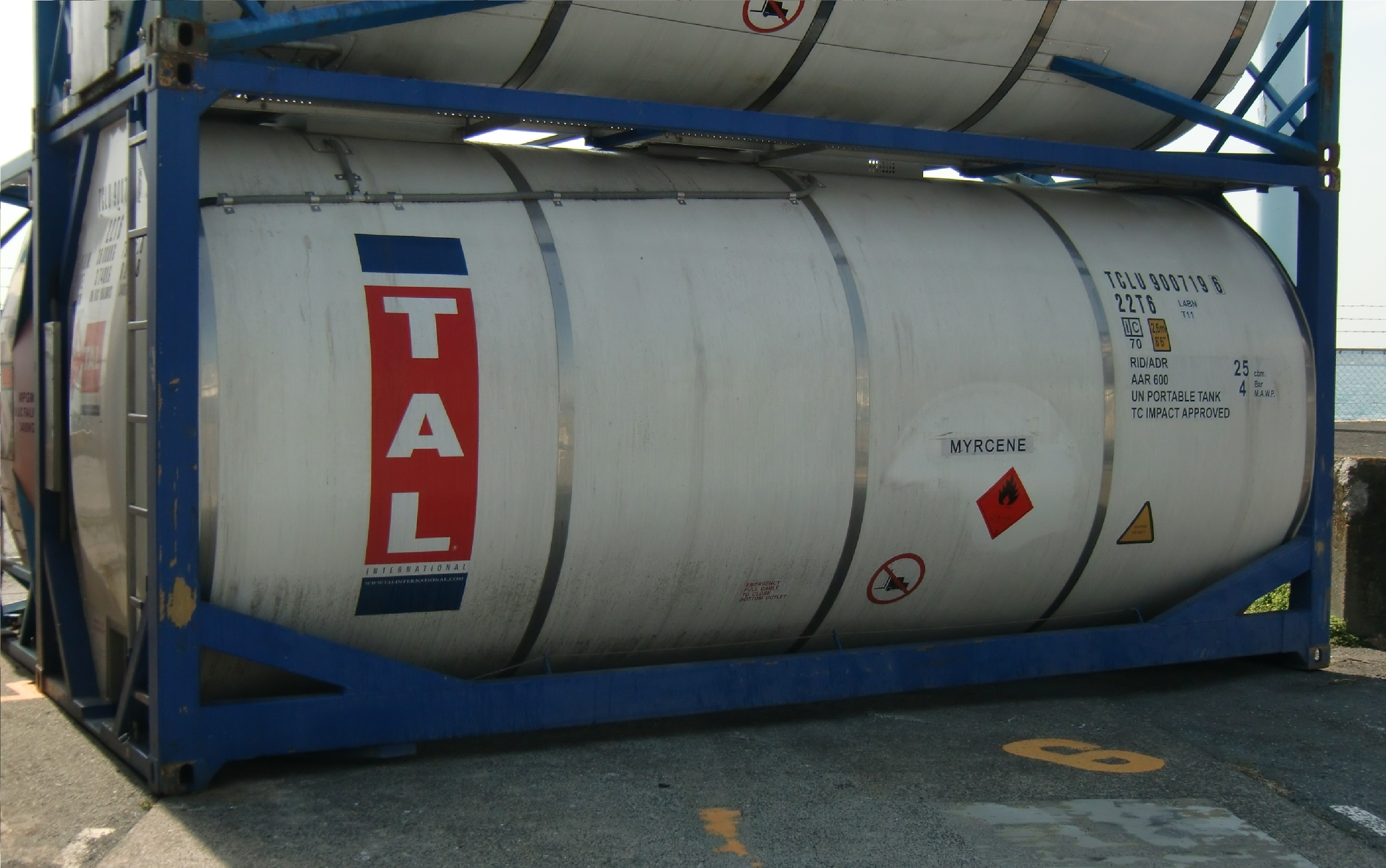
Shipping container of myrcene, in Japan

Although it has a pleasant odor, myrcene is rarely used directly in the perfumery industry. Instead, myrcene is a versatile precursor to many useful fragrances, such as menthol, citral, citronellol, citronellal, geraniol, nerol, and linalool. Several of these result from myrcene's reactions with hydrogen chloride to give geranyl chloride, neryl chloride, linalyl chloride, and myrcenyl chloride, all of which can be hydrolyzed to the corresponding alcohols.

Both myrcene and myrcenol undergo Diels–Alder reactions with several dienophiles, such as acrolein. One of the resulting cyclohexene derivatives is Lyral. Another fragrance compound made from myrcene is Ambramone.

Myrcene also contributes a peppery, balsamic aroma in beer.

== Polymerization ==
Like other conjugated dienes, including other terpenes, myrcene is prone to polymerization. Samples are stabilized by the addition of alkylphenols or tocopherol. Some of these polymers are useful, such as a phenol-myrcene copolymer and resins derived from maleic anhydride.

== Health and safety ==
Myrcene, like most terpenes, has very low acute toxicity, estimated to be >5g/kg (oral for rats, rabbits).

As of October 2018, the U.S. FDA withdrew authorization for the use of myrcene as a synthetic flavoring substance in food, without regard to its continuing stance that this substance does not pose a risk to public health under the conditions of its intended use.

The International Agency for Research on Cancer (IARC) determined that β-myrcene is "possibly carcinogenic to humans" (Group 2B) in 2019.

== See also ==
- Perfume allergy
