= Citronellol =

Pair of enantiomers

- (+)-Citronellol (left) and (−)-citronellol (right)

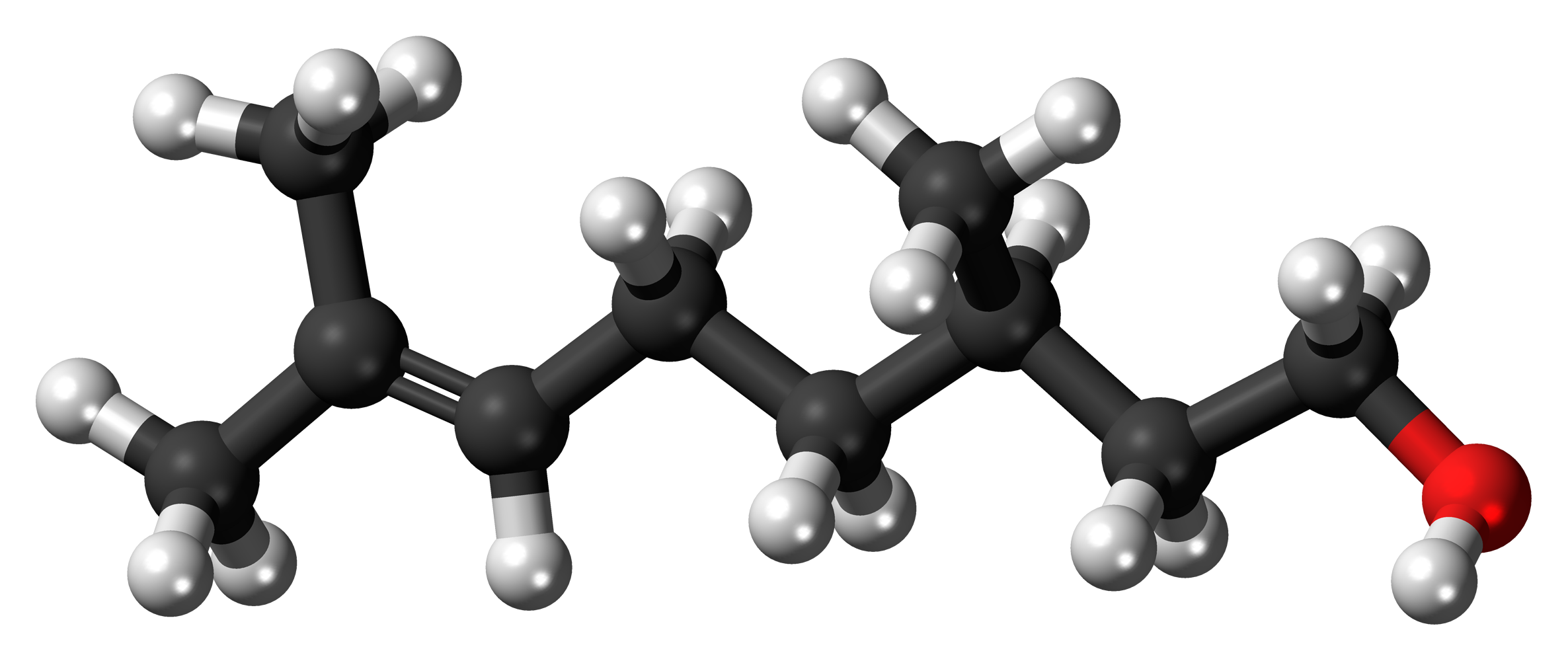
- R-(+)-Citronellol

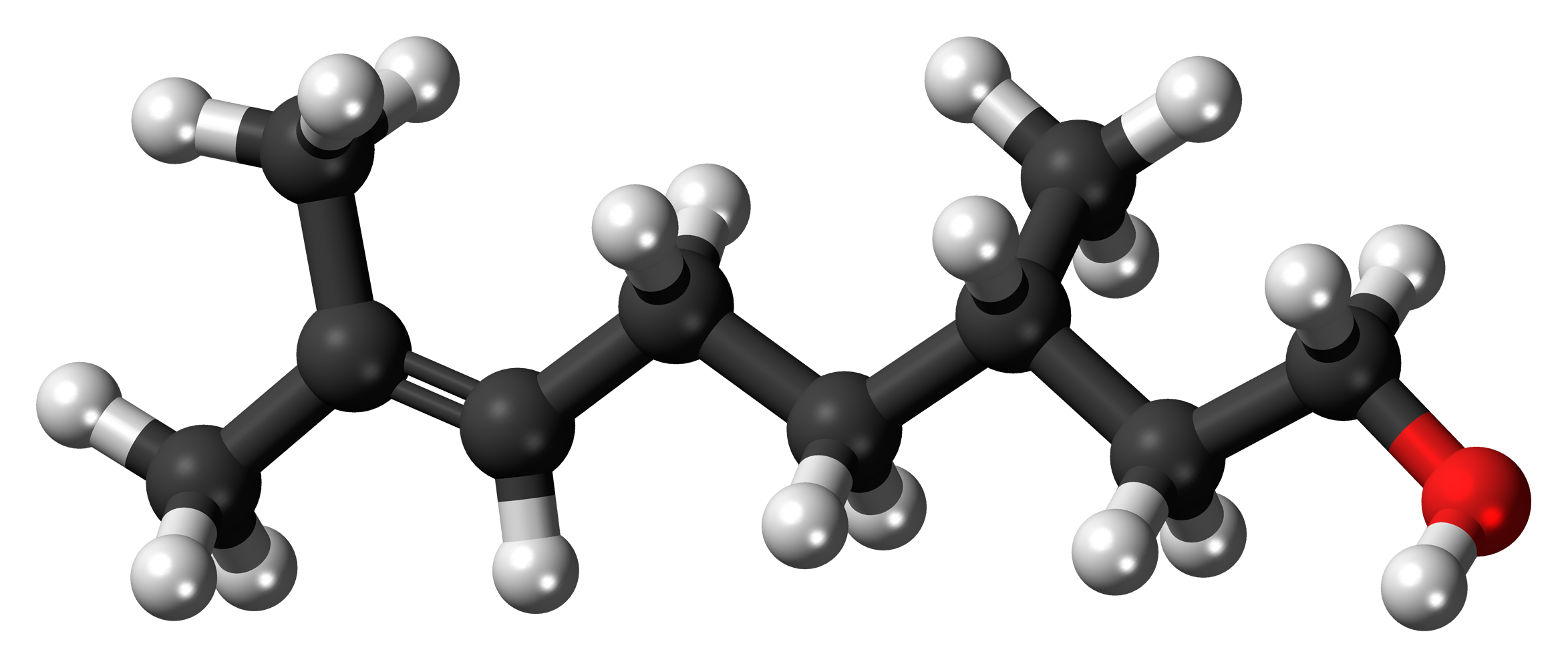
- S-(−)-Citronellol

Names
- IUPAC name 3,7-Dimethyloct-6-en-1-ol
- Other names (±)-β-Citronellol; Cephrol, Corol

Identifiers
CAS Number	106-22-9; 1117-61-9 (R); 7540-51-4 (S)
3D model (JSmol)	Interactive image; Interactive image
Beilstein Reference	1362474
ChEBI	CHEBI:50462
ChEMBL	ChEMBL395827
ChemSpider	13850135
ECHA InfoCard	100.003.069
EC Number	247-737-6
KEGG	C09849
PubChem CID	8842
UNII	565OK72VNF; P01OUT964K (R); 8RSY5Y5658 (S)
CompTox Dashboard (EPA)	DTXSID3026726
- InChI: InChI=1S/C10H20O/c1-9(2)5-4-6-10(3)7-8-11/h5,10-11H,4,6-8H2,1-3H3 Key: QMVPMAAFGQKVCJ-UHFFFAOYSA-N; InChI=1/C10H20O/c1-9(2)5-4-6-10(3)7-8-11/h5,10-11H,4,6-8H2,1-3H3/t10-/m1/s1 Key: QMVPMAAFGQKVCJ-SNVBAGLBBU; InChI=1/C10H20O/c1-9(2)5-4-6-10(3)7-8-11/h5,10-11H,4,6-8H2,1-3H3 Key: QMVPMAAFGQKVCJ-UHFFFAOYAO
- SMILES: OCC[C@@H](CC/C=C(/C)C)C; C\C(C)=C\CCC(C)CCO

Properties
Chemical formula	C_{10}H_{20}O
Molar mass	156.269 g·mol^{−1}
Density	0.855 g/cm^{3}
Boiling point	225 °C (437 °F; 498 K)
Viscosity	11.1 mPa s

Hazards
- GHS labelling
Pictograms	(GHS07: Exclamation mark) (GHS09: Environmental hazard)
Signal word	Warning
Hazard statements	H315, H317, H319
Precautionary statements	P261, P264, P272, P273, P280, P302+P352, P305+P351+P338, P321, P332+P313, P333+P313, P337+P313, P362, P363, P391, P501
NFPA 704 (fire diamond)	1 2 0
- Except where otherwise noted, data are given for materials in their standard state (at 25 °C [77 °F], 100 kPa). verify (what is ?) Infobox references

Citronellol, or dihydrogeraniol, is a natural acyclic monoterpenoid. Both enantiomers occur in nature. (+)-Citronellol, which is found in citronella oils, including Cymbopogon nardus (50%), is the more common isomer. (−)-Citronellol is widespread, but particularly abundant in the oils of rose (18–55%) and Pelargonium geraniums.

== Preparation ==
Several million kilograms of citronellol are produced annually. It is mainly obtained by partial hydrogenation of geraniol or nerol over copper chromite catalyst. Hydrogenation of both C=C bonds using a nickel catalyst gives tetrahydrogeraniol, yet another commercial fragrance.

Homogeneous catalysts have been investigated for the production of enantiomers.

== Uses ==
Citronellol is used in perfumes and as a fragrance in cleaning products. In many applications, one of the enantiomers is preferred. It is a component of citronella oil, an insect repellant.

The racemic material is described as having a floral, leathery, waxy, and rose aroma. The dextro enantiomer, (R)-citronellol is described as citronella, rose, leafy, and oily, whilst the laevo enantiomer is described as floral, rose, waxy, geranium, and powdery.

Citronellol is used as a raw material for the production of rose oxide. It is also a precursor to many commercial and potential fragrances such as citronellol acetate, citronellyl oxyacetaldehyde, citronellyl methyl acetal, and ethyl citronellyl oxalate.

== Health and safety ==
The United States FDA considers citronellol as generally recognized as safe (GRAS) for food use. Citronellol is subject to restrictions on its use in perfumery, as some people may become sensitised to it, but the degree to which citronellol can cause an allergic reaction in humans is disputed.

In terms of dermal safety, citronellol has been evaluated as an insect repellent.

== See also ==
- Citronellal
- Geraniol
- Rhodinol
- Pelargonium graveolens
- Perfume intolerance (allergy)
