= Perfume intolerance =

Adverse reaction to ingredients in perfumes

Perfume intolerance or perfume allergy is a condition wherein people exhibit sensitivity or allergic reactions to ingredients in some perfumes and some other fragrances. It is a form of multiple chemical sensitivity, a more general phenomenon for this diagnosis.

== Symptoms ==
Symptoms depend on each person's allergies and each perfume's or fragrance's ingredients. Symptoms may include allergic contact dermatitis, asthma attacks, headaches, and others. The most common allergic reactions to perfume or fragrances added to products is contact dermatitis, though other symptoms may occur, including allergic conjunctivitis.

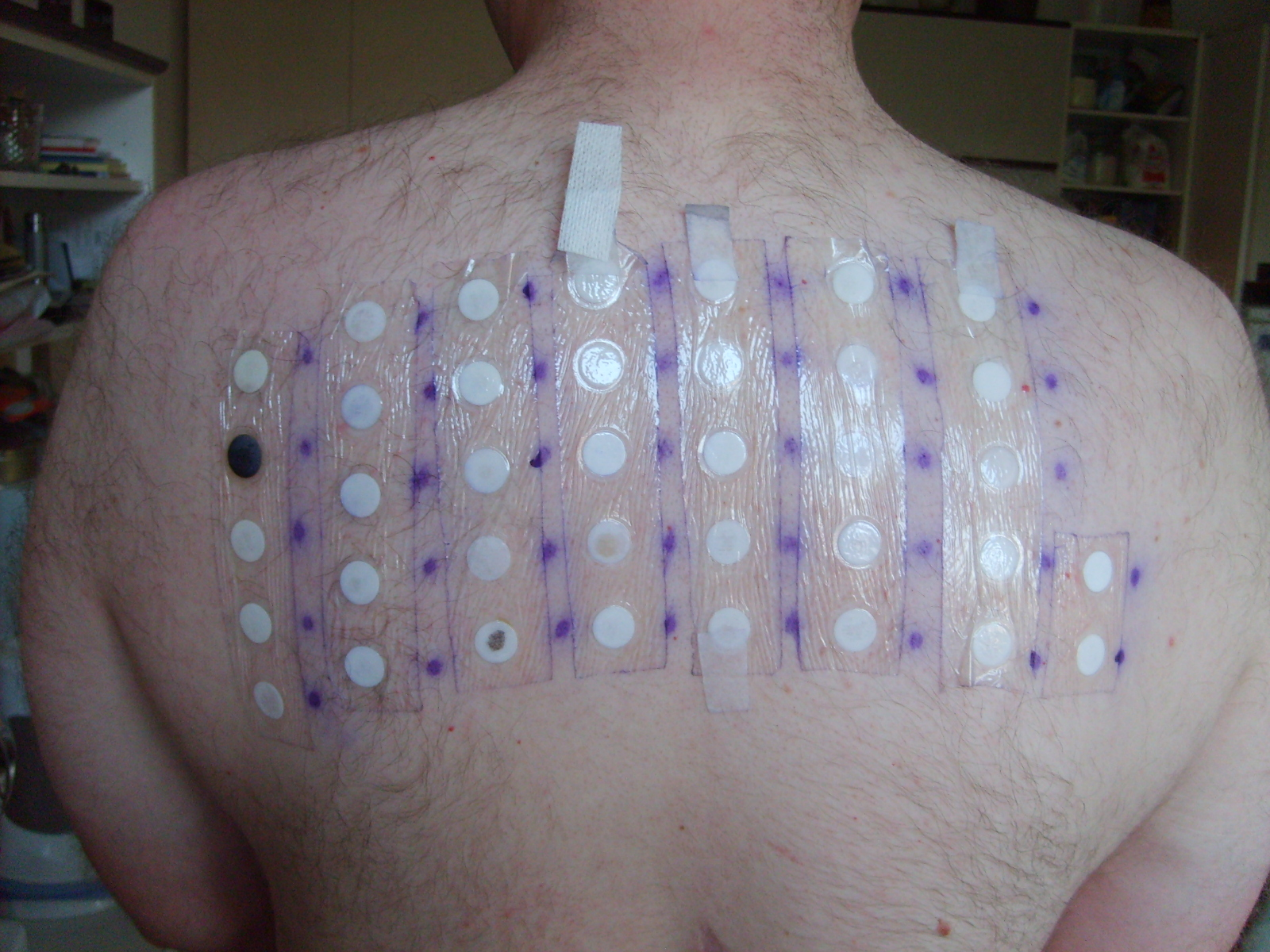
Patch test

The diagnosis of the causal allergen is made by patch testing with a mixture of fragrance ingredients, the fragrance mix. This gives a positive patch-test reaction in about 10% of tested patients with eczema, and the most recent estimates show that 1.7–4.1% of the general population are sensitized to ingredients of the fragrance mix.

Two studies show that inhalant-like allergies and sensitivity/intolerances are experienced by a subset of the US population, in the form of asthma and chemical sensitivities. Results aggregated from both surveys found that 30.5% of the general population reported scented products on others irritating, 19% reported adverse health effects from air fresheners, and 10.9% reported irritation by scented laundry products vented outside.

Household products, such as soaps and detergents, perfume products, cosmetics, and other consumer goods, are estimated to use 2,500 different fragrance ingredients. Of those, approximately 100 different substances are known to elicit responses in at least some individuals. An estimated 1.7–4.1% of the general population shows a contact allergic response to a mix of common perfume ingredients.

Although products can be labeled "fragrance-free", many still contain lesser-known fragrance chemicals that consumers may not recognize.

Cinnamaldehyde (cinnamic aldehyde) is a common fragrance allergen.
