= C10H16O2 =

The molecular formula C_{10}H_{16}O_{2} may refer to:

- Ascaridole
- Chrysanthemic acid
- trans-4,5-Epoxy-(E)-2-decenal
- Geranic acid
- Iridodial
- Iridomyrmecin
- Jasmine lactone
- Lineatin
- Massoia lactone
- Nepetalactol
- Nerolic acid
