= Nasonov =

Nasonov (Russian: Насонов) is a Russian masculine surname, its feminine counterpart is Nasonova. It may refer to

- Nikolai Nasonov (1855–1939), Russian zoologist
  - Nasonov pheromone
  - Nasonov's gland
- Oleksandr Nasonov (born 1992), Ukrainian football defender
- Olga Antonova (athlete) (née Nasonova; born 1960), Russian sprinter
