= Insect pheromones =

Neurotransmitters used by insects

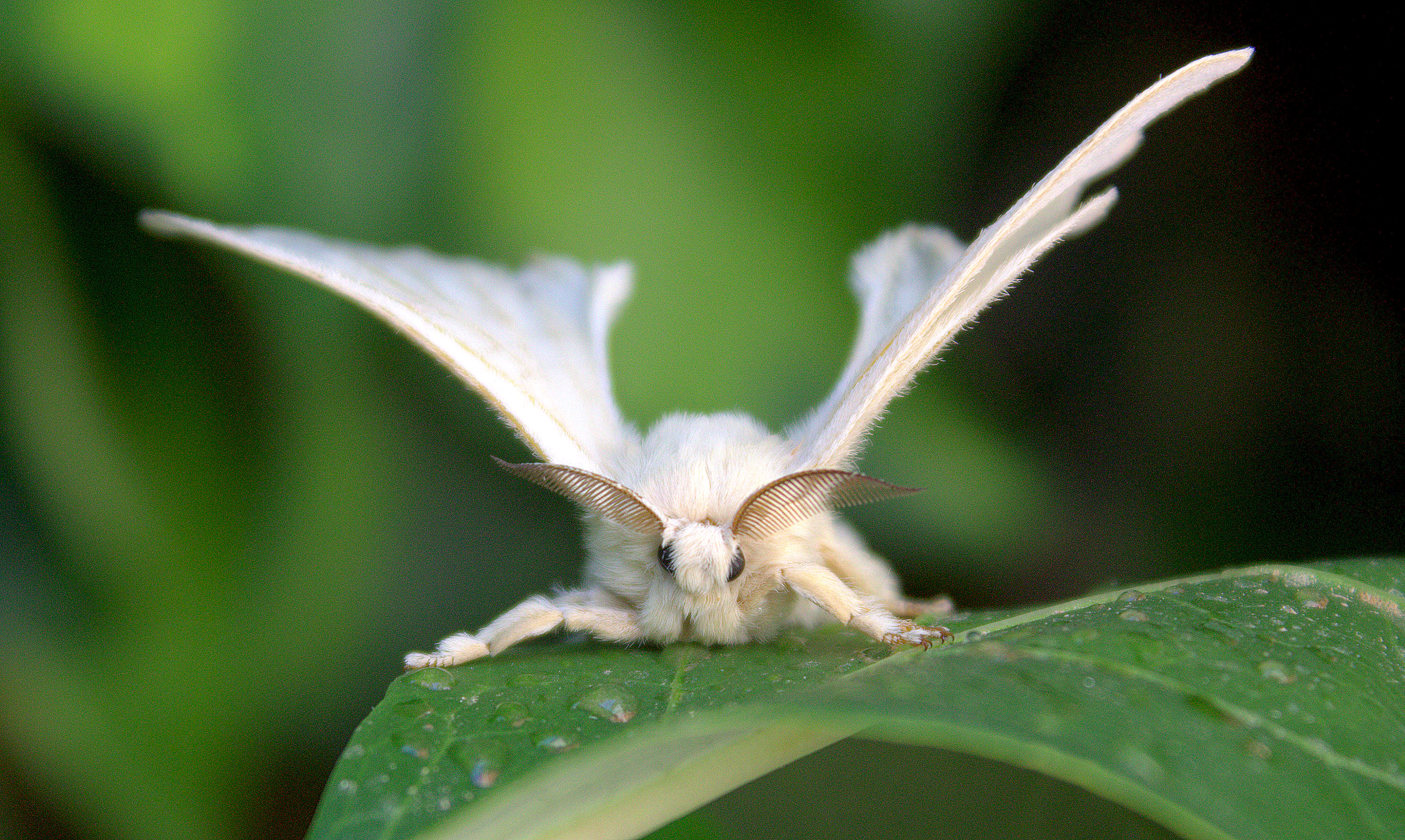
500,000 scent glands of the female silkmoth (Bombyx mori) were needed to elucidate the molecular structure of bombycol.

Structural formula of bombycol, the first clearly chemically identified insect pheromone

Insect pheromones are neurotransmitters that serve the chemical communication between individuals of an insect species. They thus differ from kairomones, in other words, neurotransmitters that transmit information to non-species organisms. Insects produce pheromones in special glands and release them into the environment. In the pheromone receptors of the sensory cells of the recipient, they produce a nerve stimulus even in very low concentrations, which ultimately leads to a behavioral response. Intraspecific communication of insects via these substances takes place in a variety of ways and serves, among other things, to find sexual partner, to maintain harmony in a colony of socially living insects, to mark territories or to find nest sites and food sources.

In 1959, the German biochemist and Nobel Prize winner Adolf Butenandt identified and synthesized the unsaturated fatty alcohol bombycol, the sex pheromone of the domestic silk moth (Bombyx mori), as the first known insect pheromone. The sex pheromones of female butterflies are mostly mono- or bis-olefinic fatty acids or their esters, fatty alcohols, their esters or the corresponding aldehydes. Male butterflies use a wide range of chemicals as sex pheromones, for example pyrrolizidine alkaloids, terpenes and aromatic compounds such as benzaldehyde.

Research into the chemical communication of insects is expanding our understanding of how they locate their food sources or places to lay eggs. For example, beekeepers use an artificially produced Nasanov pheromone containing terpenes such as geraniol and citral to attract bees to an unused hive. The agriculture and forestry industries use insect pheromones commercially in pest control using insect traps to prevent egg laying and in practicing the mating disruption. It is expected that insect pheromones can also contribute in this way to the control of insect-borne infectious diseases such as malaria, dengue fever or African trypanosomiasis.

== Etymology and classification ==
Adolf Butenandt and Peter Karlson proposed the term pheromones in 1959 for substances that serve intraspecific communication. The definition of the term pheromone was given in the same year by Karlson and the Swiss zoologist Martin Lüscher. According to this, pheromones are

"Substances released externally by one individual that elicit specific responses in another individual of the same species." – Peter Karlson, Martin Lüscher, 1959.

The word pheromone consists of the ancient Greek parts of speech φέρειν phérein, überbringen, melden, and ὁρμᾶν hormān, antreiben, erregen. According to Karlson and Lüscher, the goal was to coin an internationally understandable scientific term for a class of substances based on a clear definition. It was to be a short word that could be spoken in many languages. The ending mone served as a suffix, as it occurs in the words hormone, kairomone, and allomone thus emphasizing their relationship. The term pheromone replaced the term ectohormone or homoiohormone, which Albrecht Bethe had already proposed in 1932 with the same definition. Bethe's term was not accepted because, according to Butenandt, the terms ecto and hormone were mutually exclusive. The mechanism of action of a pheromone also does not correspond to that of a hormone absorbed into the circulatory system by another individual and was therefore considered misleading.

The classification of intraspecific pheromones in the group of semiochemicals, in other words, neurotransmitters that serve communication between organisms, is shown in the following diagram:

Karlson further divided them into the sense of smell and the oral-acting insect pheromones according to the mode of reception. In 1963, Edward O. Wilson, who had discovered ant trace pheromones the year before, and William H. Bossert introduced the concepts of releaser and primer pheromones. Releaser pheromones, which are usually perceived olfactorily, cause an instantaneously observable behavioral reaction, whereas primer pheromones, which are often oral, trigger physiological changes in the recipient. Primerpheromones, for example, suppress the formation of ovaries in worker bees.

Often, pheromones are defined according to their behavior-triggering function. In addition to the well-known sex attractants, they act, among other things, as aggregation pheromones, dispersion pheromones, alarm pheromones, tracking pheromones, marker pheromones, brood recognition pheromones, egg-laying pheromones, recruitment pheromones, or as caste recognition agents.

Vincent Dethier divided insect pheromones into six categories according to their general behavior-triggering effects. These include prisoners, which are normally only perceptible at short distances and cause an insect in motion to stop, and locomotor stimulants, which increase the insect's speed or decrease the number of directional changes. Lockstoffe are attractants that trigger an oriented movement toward the odor source, whereas repellents trigger an escape movement away from it. Feeding and oviposition stimulants, respectively, trigger feeding or oviposition. Deterrents, on the other hand, inhibit feeding or oviposition.

Functionally defined insect pheromones often contain mixtures of different components in precisely defined proportions. These so-called pheromone cocktails often contain substances of different categories with near and far orientation functions. For example, the aggregation pheromone cocktail of the German cockroach Blattella germanica contains both substances that act as attractants and substances that act as arrestants.

In part, insect pheromones are named after the site of their biological production. Males of various moth species, such as the banana butterfly, possess so-called androconial organs in the abdomen that release pheromones. These insect pheromones are appropriately called androconial pheromones. The queen bee of the Western honey bee produce the queen bee pheromone in mandibular glands. In English, they are therefore often referred to as queen mandibular gland pheromones.

== History ==
=== First discoveries ===
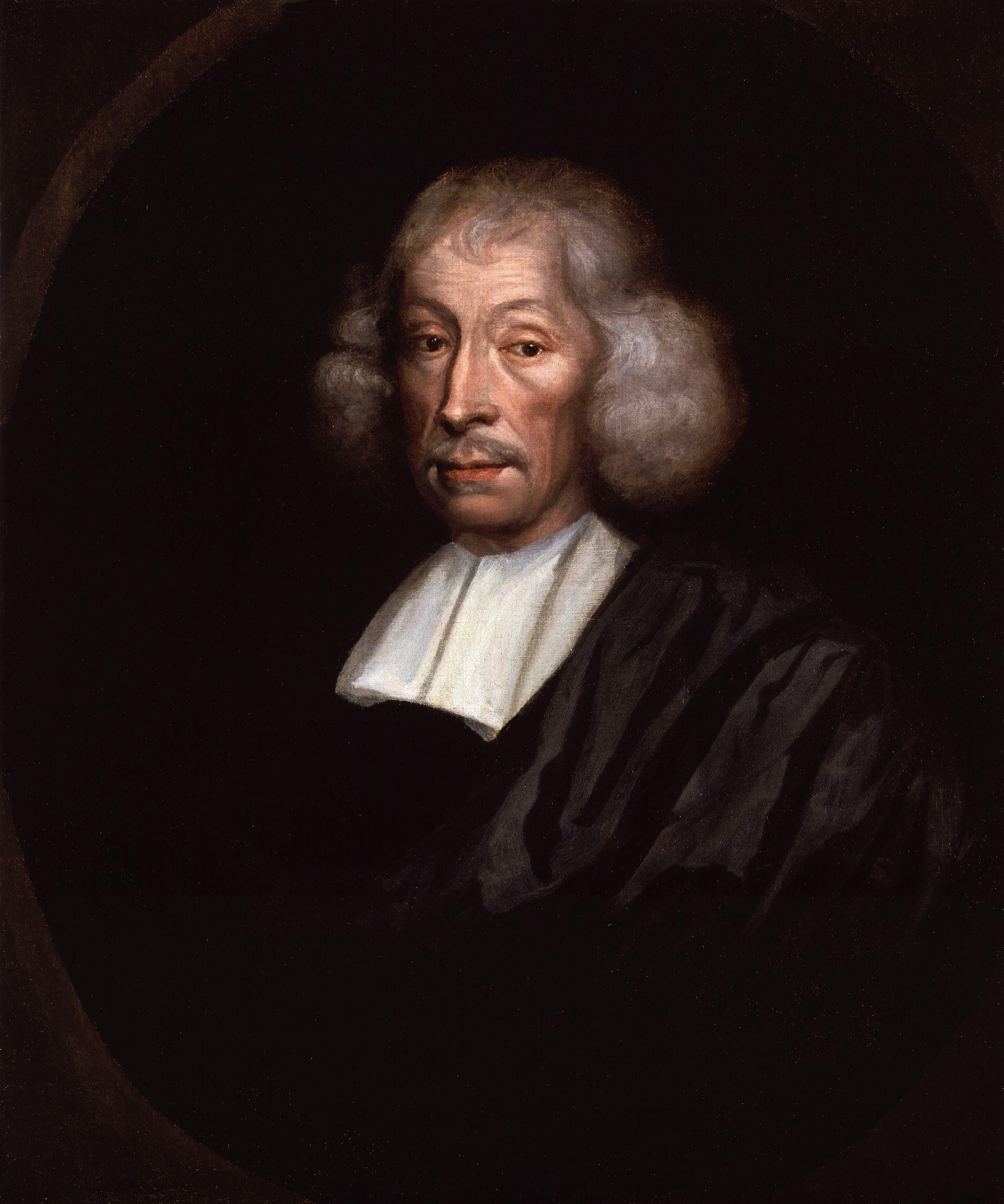
John Ray

In 1609, the English beekeeper Charles Butler observed that the sting of a bee released a liquid. This liquid attracted other bees, which then began to sting en masse. Butler thus demonstrated for the first time the effect of an alarm pheromone of bees, which was identified as isoamyl acetate in the 1960s. Butler's observation was the first to show the effect of an alarm pheromone of bees, which was identified as isoamyl acetate in the 1960s.

As early as 1690, Sir John Ray suspected that peppered moths attracted male conspecifics by means of a scent:

"It emerged out of a stick-shaped geometer caterpillar: it was a female and came out from its chrysalis shut up in my cage: the windows were open in the room or closet where it was kept, and two male moths flying round were caught by my wife who by a lucky chance were into the room in the night: they were attracted, as it seems to me, by the scent of the female and came in from outside."

– John Ray

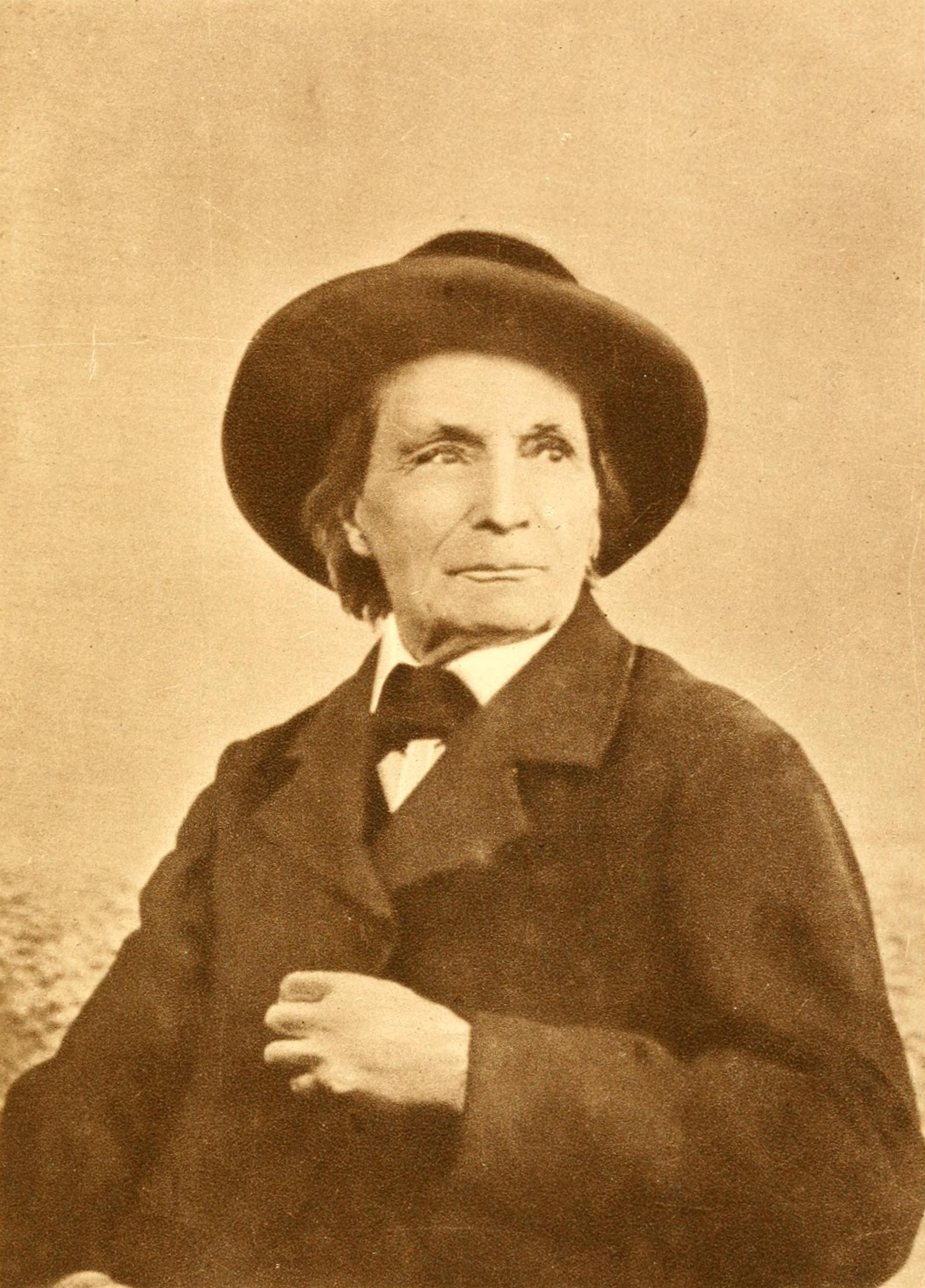
Jean-Henri Fabre

The French entomologist Jean-Henri Fabre also reported in the mid-19th century on experiments with Saturnia and oak eggar in which females trapped in wire cages attracted hundreds of males within a few days at specific times. In experiments with tagged domestic silk moth, 40% of males from a distance of four kilometers and 26% of males from eleven kilometers still found their way to a trapped female. The morphology of the moths was also reported in the mid-19th century.

In many insect species, researchers long puzzled over the mechanism of mating: visual or acoustic stimuli could not explain Fabre's experiments, nor how moths found females ready to mate with great certainty. Theories of attraction by infrared or other radiation were not confirmed. The organization of eusociality remained equally inexplicable for a long time. The writer and bee researcher Maurice Maeterlinck speculated about the spirit of the hive, the (team) Spirit of the hive, without being able to determine its essence in more detail. Theories about the attraction by infrared or radiation also remained unexplained for a long time.

=== Definitions of Bethe ===
At the beginning of the 20th century, Ernest Starling discovered hormones as the first biological neurotransmitters. In 1932, the neurophysiologist Albrecht Bethe, who at that time headed the Institute of Animal Physiology at the Goethe University Frankfurt, published an article on an expanded hormone concept in which he distinguished between endohormones and ectohormones. According to this, endohormones act in the producing organism itself and correspond to the classical hormone definition. In contrast, the organism releases ectohormones externally and transfers them to other individuals. As an example, Bethe cited the effect of the lactation hormone, which is released by a fetus to its mother and causes the growth of the mammary gland and subsequently the secretion of milk. He also proposed this concept for chemical communication among insects.

"In bees, for example, the workers (i.e. not the mothers) are able to raise a sexually capable queen from an egg or a young larva [...] by special food and transfer of secretions of their salivary glands. There can hardly be any doubt (although it has not been proven) that ectohormones of the salivary gland secretions play the main role in this redifferentiation." – Albrecht Bethe[6]

Bethe further divided the ectohormones into homoiohormones, which – according to today's definition of a pheromone – act on individuals of the same species, and alloiohormones, which act on individuals of a different species. He thus coined the precursor term of allelochemicals.

=== Works from Butenandt ===
Adolf Butenandt also suspected that communication among insects was based on neurotransmitters, and in the 1940s he began a project to identify the sexual attractant of the domestic silk moth (Bombyx mori). It is a butterfly originally native to China, belonging to the family of the Bombycidae, which is used for sericulture and its breeding and keeping was well known. It was only after almost 20 years of work that he finally succeeded in extracting and purifying a substance from more than 500,000 insects, which Butenandt later named Bombykol.

By elemental analysis, Butenandt determined the chemical formula of the substance to be C_{16}H_{30}O. Infrared spectroscopic studies indicated the presence of conjugated double bonds. Using methods common at the time, such as catalytic hydrogenation, melting point determination, and oxidative degradation by potassium permanganate, Butenandt showed that the substance sought was an unsaturated fatty alcohol, (10E,12Z)-10,12-Hexadecadien-1-ol.

Butenandt then synthesized bombycol from vernolic acid [(12R,13S)-Epoxy-9-cis-octadecenoic acid] in several steps via diol formation, its cleavage to the aldehyde, double bond isomerization, and Wittig reaction. He synthesized the four possible stereoisomers and tested them for their biological activity. Only one isomer showed the same activity as the extract. Butenandt thus provided evidence that communication among insects takes place on a substance-by-substance basis.

"By extraction and condensation experiments, however, it has been convincingly shown that a material principle must be present which is secreted by the female butterflies from scent organs of the last abdominal segments and perceived by the males with their antennae." – Adolf Butenandt

=== Primer and releaser pheromones ===
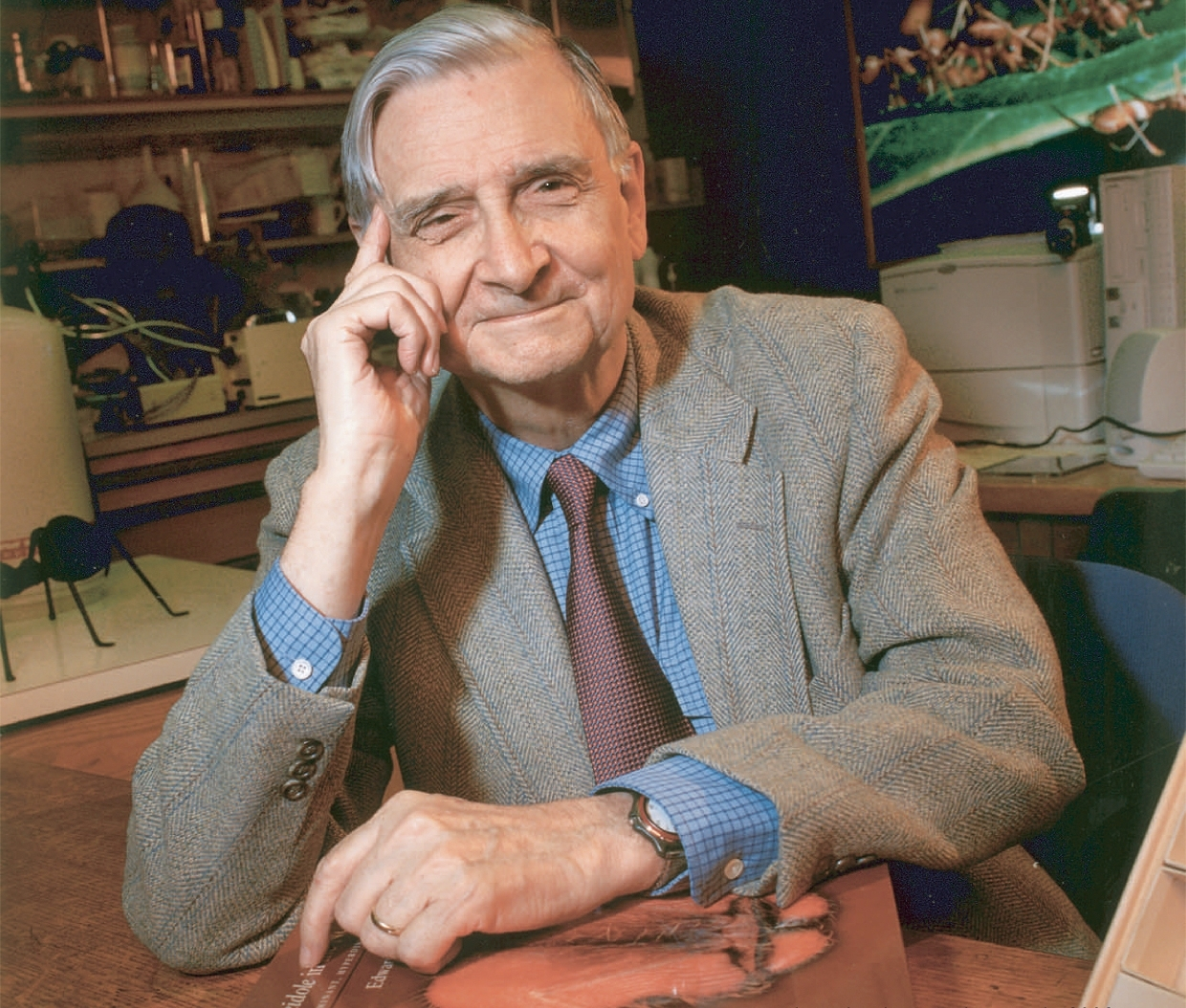
E. O. Wilson

Towards the end of the 1950s, Edward O. Wilson defined substances that trigger the alarm and burrowing behavior of ants as chemical releaser. In 1961, the British biochemist Robert Kenneth Callow identified another pheromone, also known as the queen bee pheromone, with the compound (E)-9-oxo-dec-2-enoic acid, or 9-ODA for short. The effect of this pheromone was obviously of a different nature than that of the alarm pheromones, since it had a long-term effect on the physiology of the recipients.

In 1963, Wilson, who the year before had already discovered the trace pheromones of ants, and William H. Bossert introduced the term releaser and primer pheromones for this purpose, to distinguish the behavior-controlling effect of, for example, sex attractants from the pheromones that interfere with the endocrine system of the receiver.

=== Modern research directions ===
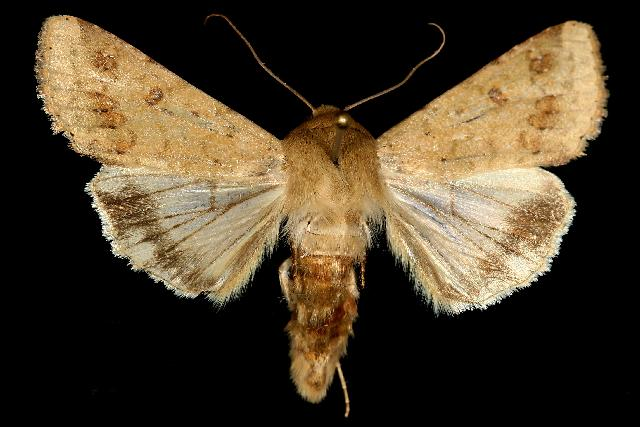
Preparation of Helicoverpa zea

As a result of the enormously refined extraction and analytical chemistry over the years, chemists and biologists identified numerous other pheromones. For the detection of the second component of the pheromone cocktail of Bombyx mori, the bombycal [(10Z,12E)-hexadecadienal], an extract of 460 glands from which 15 nanograms of the aldehyde were isolated was already sufficient in 1978.

In addition to studying the function and reception of pheromones and their chemical identification, scientists extensively investigated the biochemistry of pheromone production. In 1984, Ashok Raina and Jerome Klun discovered that the production of the female sex attractant of the owlet moths Helicoverpa zea is controlled by hormonal substances called pheromone biosynthesis-activating neuropeptides (PBANs) in the brains of female moths. Other modern research focuses on the study of insect pheromone reception by means of the sense of smell and taste, genetic factors, and evolutionary biology issues, such as the coevolution of female sex pheromone production and reception in the male.

Combating disease vectors such as Anopheles is another focus of research. According to World Health Organization estimates, the number of malaria infections in 2012 was about 207 million with 627,000 deaths. Culex mosquitoes transmit the causative agent of filariasis or West Nile virus. Traps equipped with oviposition pheromones offer one way to contain these populations. To optimize these, the scent-binding proteins in the antennae of females, which play a critical role in detecting oviposition sites, are being intensively studied.

== Production ==
The pheromones in insects are often the secondary products of fatty acids, such as saturated and unsaturated hydrocarbons, fatty alcohols, esters and aldehydes, but also isoprenoids and other compounds. Pheromones are often not pure substances, but so-called pheromone cocktails consisting of various components. Often, only one specific enantiomer of a compound triggers a behavioral reaction, while the other enantiomer triggers no reaction or a different reaction.

Sometimes the biosynthesis of the pheromone occurs only when the biochemical precursors in the form of certain alkaloids have been ingested from food plants. In this case, the sex pheromone simultaneously signals the presence of food sources.

Due to the potential commercial application in crop protection, the intensity of the study of pheromones increased greatly after Butenandt's discovery, leading to the development of highly sensitive analytical methods and the widespread application of chemo-, regio-, and stereoselective syntheses in organic chemistry.

=== Biosynthesis ===
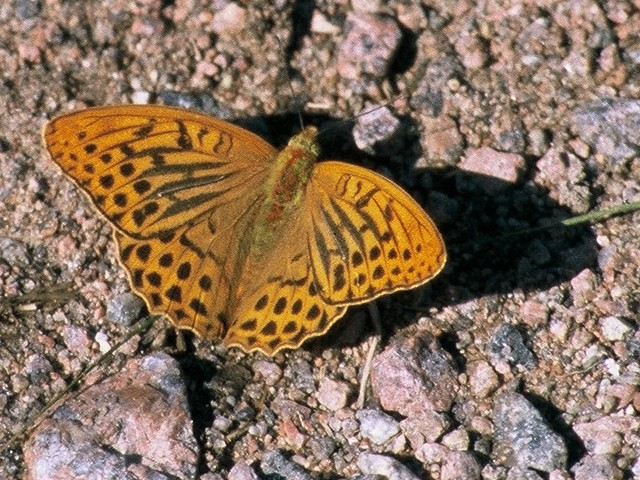
Male of silver-washed fritillary with four elongated scent scale patches (scent scale stripes) on each forewing

Insect pheromones are produced by a variety of exocrine glands consisting primarily of modified epidermal cells at various sites on the insect body. For example, the abdominal glands of the female silkmoth release traces of the (E,E)-isomer of alcohol as well as the analogous (E,Z)-aldehyde bombycal, in addition to the sex pheromone bombycol. Suitable surface geometries in the vicinity of the glands, such as grooved pore plates, may favor effective evaporation of a leaked pheromone. Honey bees possess 15 glands with which they produce and release a number of different substances, thus maintaining a complex communication system based on pheromones. Males of various butterfly species possess so-called androconial organs in the abdomen with which they can disseminate pheromones, while other moths release them via scent shed or scent bristles on their forewings or the end of the abdomen. The scent bristles and scent scales serve to increase surface area and facilitate the evaporation of insect pheromones.

Rather than evolving a completely unique set of enzymes for pheromone biosynthesis, insects often modify normal metabolites into pheromones with high regio-, chemo-, (E/Z)-, diastereo-, or enantioselectivity and in well-defined ratios. Biosynthesis of insect pheromones occurs either de novo following the scheme of fatty acid synthesis by successive addition of malonyl-CoA to an initial acetyl or by uptake of precursors from the diet. Many butterflies use the biosynthetic possibility of producing a specific mixture of derivatives of simple fatty acids. The evolution of the enzyme Δ-11-desaturase combined with chain-shortening reactions allows them to produce a variety of unsaturated acetates, aldehydes, and alcohols in various combinations.

Dehydrogenation of the carbon chain and reduction of the acid function to the alcohol occurs, if necessary, through special enzyme systems. Further steps can be oxidation to the aldehyde or acetylation to the acetate. In Bombyx mori, the biosynthesis is activated diurnally by pheromones through a neurohormone, the so-called pheromone biosynthesis-activating neuropeptide (PBAN). The pheromone biosynthesis-activating neuropeptide (PBAN) is a neurohormone.

The hormonal mechanisms of pheromone production vary considerably from species to species. Juvenile hormones, for example, control pheromone production in the owl butterfly Mythimna unipuncta. These are produced in mostly paired corpora allata located behind the brain and released into the hemolymph. There they bind to certain transport proteins. If the corpora allata are removed, the females do not produce pheromones. Juvenile hormones, however, interfere more indirectly with the circadian release of PBAN.

Male butterflies of the Danainae family sometimes wound caterpillars that have ingested alkaloids from milk weeds with tiny claws on their feet to ingest the exuding fluid, a behavior described as kleptopharmacophagy. The moths use the ingested alkaloids for defense against predators and to produce sex pheromones.

=== Pheromones from plant ingredients ===
Retronecine, from which many pyrrolizidine alkaloids are derived by esterification of the two hydroxyl groups.

Male fire-coloured beetles of the species Neopyrochroa flabellata and also various other beetle species use the terpenoid cantharidin as a sex pheromone and aphrodisiac pheromone, respectively. This isoprenoid is ingested by Neopyrochroa flabellata with food and transferred to females and subsequently to the brood during the mating act. Females test the content of a gland on the head of the male before mating. The cantharidin acts as a feeding toxin and renders the eggs unpalatable to predators; females therefore prefer males with a high cantharidin content.[47]

Moths such as Utetheisa ornatrix and Tirumala limniace ingest pyrrolizidine alkaloids from food plants such as crotalaria, heliotropium, or Achillea ageratum in the caterpillar, which the adult male converts by oxidation into pheromones such as hydroxydanaidal. As in the fire beetle, the alkaloids, which are potent feeding poisons and act against predators such as spiders, ants, or net-winged insects, are transferred to females and eggs. Adult monarch butterflies ingest plant secondary metabolism to increase their pheromonal attractiveness. Sometimes biosynthesis of the pheromone occurs only when biochemical precursors in the form of certain alkaloids have been ingested from food plants. In this case, the sex pheromone simultaneously signals the presence of food sources.

The uptake of pheromone precursors from plants is also known for certain species of orchid bees and peacock flies. Male bees collect a mixture of terpenoids from orchids and use them as an aggregation pheromone to form lek mating. Sometimes the plant constituents control the development of the pheromone glands of male butterflies.

=== Laboratory synthesis ===
Karl Ziegler and Günther Otto Schenck succeeded in synthesizing cantharidin as early as 1941. The preparation of pheromones requires the use of highly chemo-, regio- and stereoselective syntheses. In the 1970s, asymmetric synthesis using the SAMP method succeeded in producing various pheromones enantiomerically pure. Furthermore, chemists used asymmetric epoxidation, asymmetric dihydroxylation, biocatalysis, olefin metathesis, and many other stereoselective reactions to synthesize pheromones. The Wittig reaction is suitable for the chemical synthesis of pheromones with (Z)-olefinic double bonds.

Genetically modified tobacco plants can also produce sex pheromones. The fatty alcohols obtained from them by extraction are subsequently acetylated to obtain the respective target sex pheromones. This semisynthetic route of production produces insect pheromones in relatively large quantities and with high purity.

== Properties ==
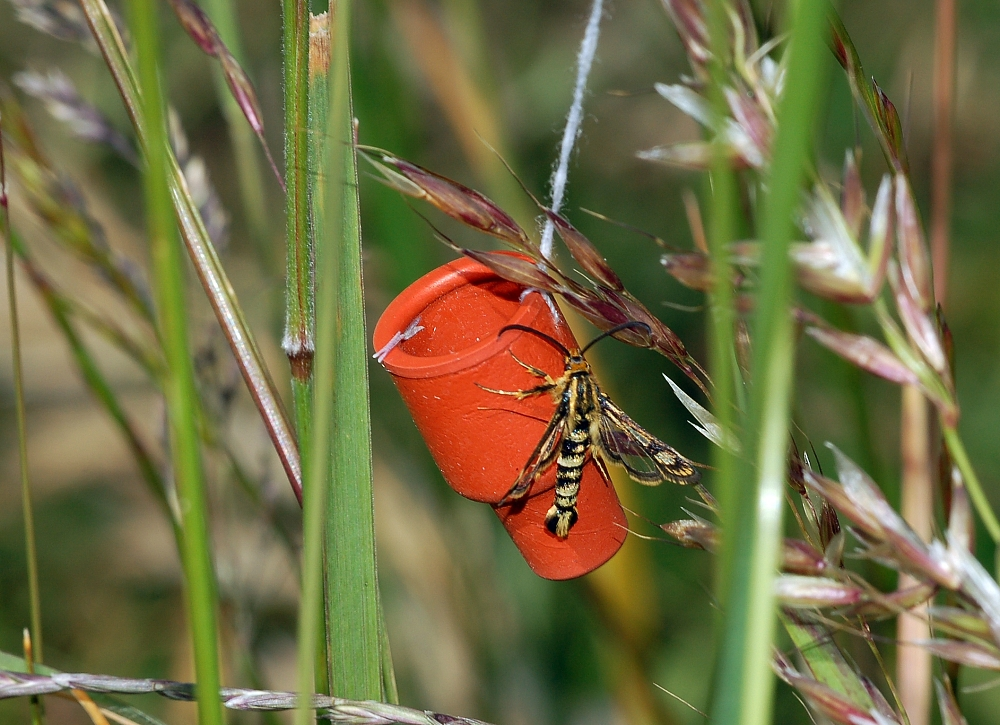
Chamaesphecia empiformis on pheromone dispenser

Chemical communication between living beings by means of pheromones follows the same principles as technical data transmission. A transmitter, for example the gland of a female insect, emits the signal in the form of a chemical substance. Both the chemical structure of the molecules and their quantity ratio determine the information content and serve as a model of communication for the species. The physical properties of the substances, such as vapor pressure, determine the function of their molecules as short- or long-range information transmitters.

The insect pheromone is transmitted by direct contact or via a medium such as water or air. From the receiver, for example the pheromone receptors in the antenna of a male insect, the substance is received and triggers a behavioral response. The term antenna was first used to refer to the antennae of insects and subsequently in engineering. Insect pheromones have a highly species-specific effect, meaning that they elicit the desired behavioral response only in biological specificity but not in individuals of other species. For example, although the chemical compounds that act as sex pheromones in butterflies may be the same in different species, the composition of the pheromone cocktail is different in all species. In addition, pheromone cocktails often contain substances that act as behavioral inhibitors for other species, such as significantly reducing the rate of approach of males of alien species to an attracting female. The pheromone cocktail is a highly effective means of inhibiting the behavior of males of other species.

=== Physico-chemical properties ===
The pheromones are usually produced as a liquid and are either transmitted by direct contact or released into the environment as a liquid or vapor. They can be either heavy or light volatile. Diffusivity significantly affects the function of the pheromone. Alarm pheromones are often highly volatile to spread quickly by diffusion. Therefore, they are often short-chain substances with relatively high vapor pressure and low complexity. There is no high requirement for species-specific coding effect as in sex pheromones. Sex pheromones have a higher complexity than most alarm pheromones, but a lower molar mass than marker pheromones, which permanently indicate an area.

In the case of flying insects - such as butterflies - the pheromone as a molecule must not be too large, otherwise the vapor pressure and volatility are too low. Thus, over 200 identified sex pheromones of butterfly species are mono- and bis-olefinic fatty aldehydes, fatty alcohols and their acetates with chains of 10 to 18 carbon atoms.

Depending on the function, there are different emission and reception scenarios. Ants, for example, emit alarm pheromones intermittently or continuously in the usually windless environment of the anthill. Trace pheromones are emitted by an ant as a moving source. Silkmoth sex pheromones are emitted in discrete scent threads in an air stream.

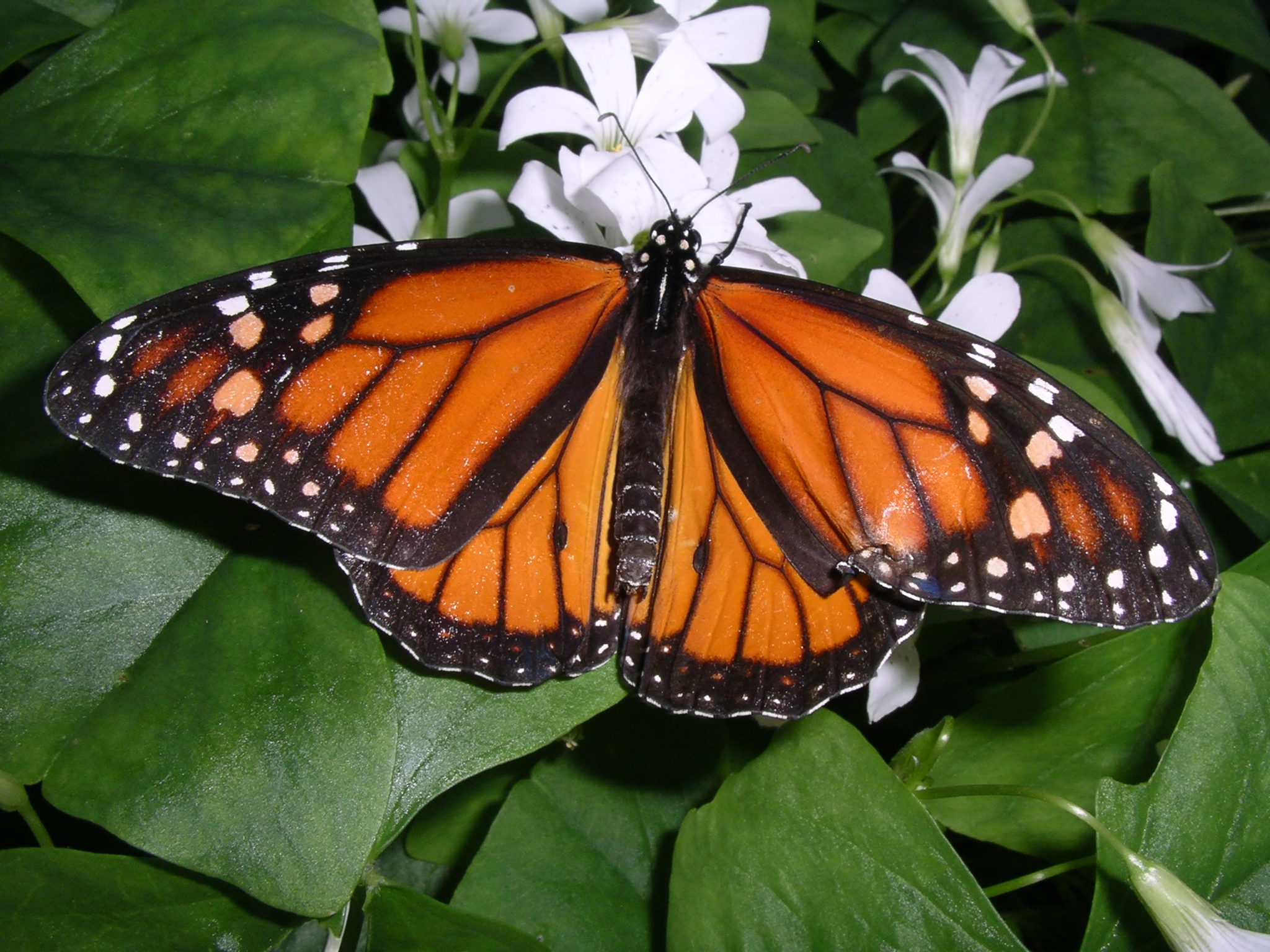
Monarch butterfly male with clearly visible scent scales pockets

Male monarch butterflies do not emit volatile pheromones, but pheromone-laden nanoparticles called pheromone transfer particles, which they use to transfer arrestants or aphrodisiac pheromones to females. The pheromone transfer particles position the males on their brush hairs and scatter them during courtship flight. The nanoparticles adhere to the antennae of the females, which are equipped with pheromone receptors, where they slowly release the pheromones, resulting in a long-lasting stimulus for the female.

Females of the Arctiinae Pyrrharctia isabella emit an aerosol consisting exclusively of sex pheromone droplets. The amount of pheromone released in this process is much greater than in other known female moths. The apparent wastefulness of the sex pheromone is explained by the short amount of time an adult has to find a reproductive partner due to the short Arctic spring.

Recipients usually perceive pheromones in an environment characterized by the presence of many other chemicals. To ensure specific perception, the pheromone chemical must either be so complex that it does not occur more than once in nature, or the correct ratio of several individual components must trigger the stimulus. However, it has been shown that only in exceptional cases does a single substance convey the message. Often, a mixture of substances must be present in very precise proportions that, in addition to the chemical structure of the individual pheromones, determine the informational content of the pheromone cocktail.

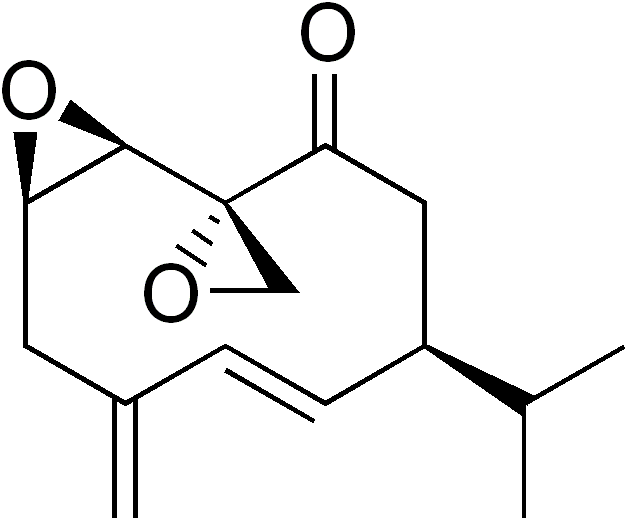
Periplanon B

The chemical structure of pheromones is directly related to their signaling function and signaling environment. Pheromones released into the air often have a carbon chain of 5 to 20 atoms and a molar mass of about 80 to 300 g-mol-1. With a carbon chain of less than five carbon atoms, the number of possible isomers is small and targeted species-specific coding is difficult. With longer carbon chains, the number of possible isomers increases rapidly.

Periplanon B, the sex pheromone of the American cockroach, is an example of a complex single substance to which males respond at extremely low levels of 10^{−5} nanograms.

=== Biological properties ===
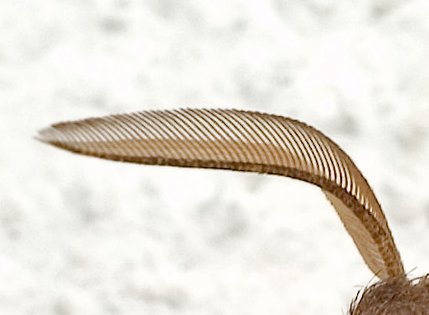
Antenna of a Lasiocampidae

The sex pheromone cocktail emitted by a female insect spreads downwind. In the recipient male, the molecules strike the antennae, where reception of the pheromones takes place by means of olfactory cells on the olfactory hairs or sensilla. The antennae adsorb about 30% of the pheromone molecules contained in an airstream. The remaining molecules hit the outer exoskeleton where they are enzymatically degraded.

The pheromone molecules first reach the cuticle of the olfactory hairs and diffuse through pores into a pore cone and from there into tubules. From there, the molecules diffuse further to the dendritic membrane. This membrane has receptors that, when a pheromone is received, cause a change in electrical resistance via the opening of ion channels, creating an electrical resistance that results in a perception. Even a single pheromone molecule can trigger a nerve impulse.[59] However, the recognition of a specific pheromone cocktail requires a certain level of excitation of different cell types of varying specificity. It is assumed that the characteristic excitations received from the different receptors in the central nervous system are modulated there into an excitation pattern. If this excitation pattern, which depends on the quantitative ratio of the received pheromone molecules, matches the coding of an innate behavioral pattern, this leads to the triggering of a corresponding behavioral response, such as the headwind approach to a pheromone source.

== Pheromone species ==
According to their effect, two classes of pheromones can be distinguished, the primer and the releaser pheromones. Under certain conditions, certain pheromones act as both releaser and primer pheromones.

=== Releaser pheromone ===
Releaser pheromones have a brief, immediate behavior-controlling effect. The first pheromone discovered, bombycol, is an example. Releaser pheromones typically include aggregation pheromones, dispersal pheromones, alarm pheromones, tracking pheromones, and marking pheromones, among others, in addition to the well-known sex pheromones.

==== Aggregation pheromones ====
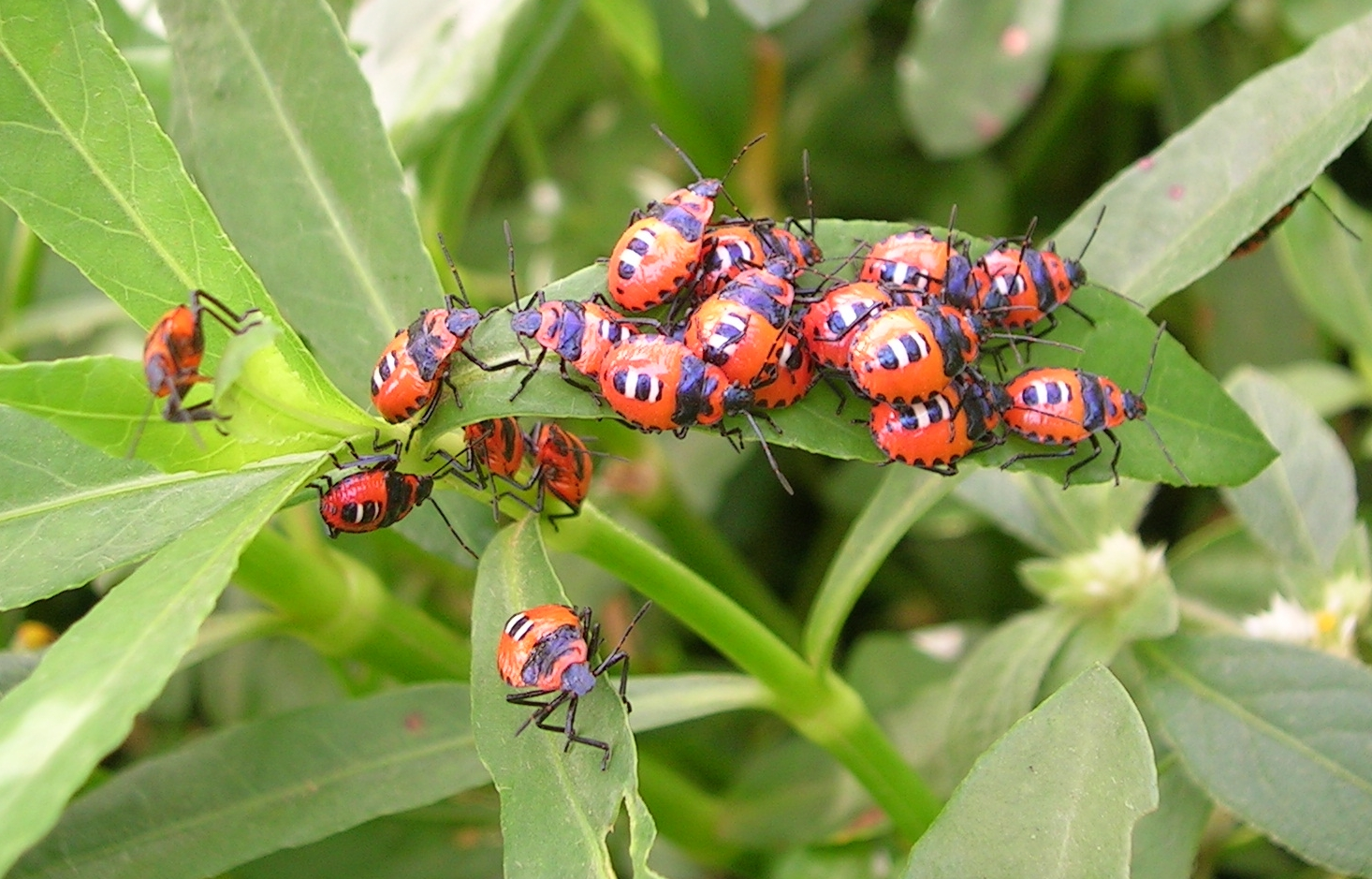
Aggregation of Pentatomidae

Aggregation pheromones are produced by both sexes and are used for the sex-nonspecific attraction of individuals of the same species. These are known, for example, in the bark beetle and other beetle species, bipeds, hemiptera and grasshoppers. Insects use aggregation pheromones for defense against predators, in mate choice, and to overcome host plant resistance to mass attack. A group of individuals at a site is referred to as an aggregation, regardless of sex. Aggregation pheromones, in addition to sex attractants, play a significant role in the development of pheromone traps for selective pest control.

Studies using electroantennogram techniques showed that aggregation pheromones elicited relatively high receptor potentials in a sex-nonspecific manner, whereas sex pheromones elicited high receptor potentials in only one sex. Aggregation pheromones may therefore be evolutionary precursors of sex pheromones.

==== Sex pheromones ====
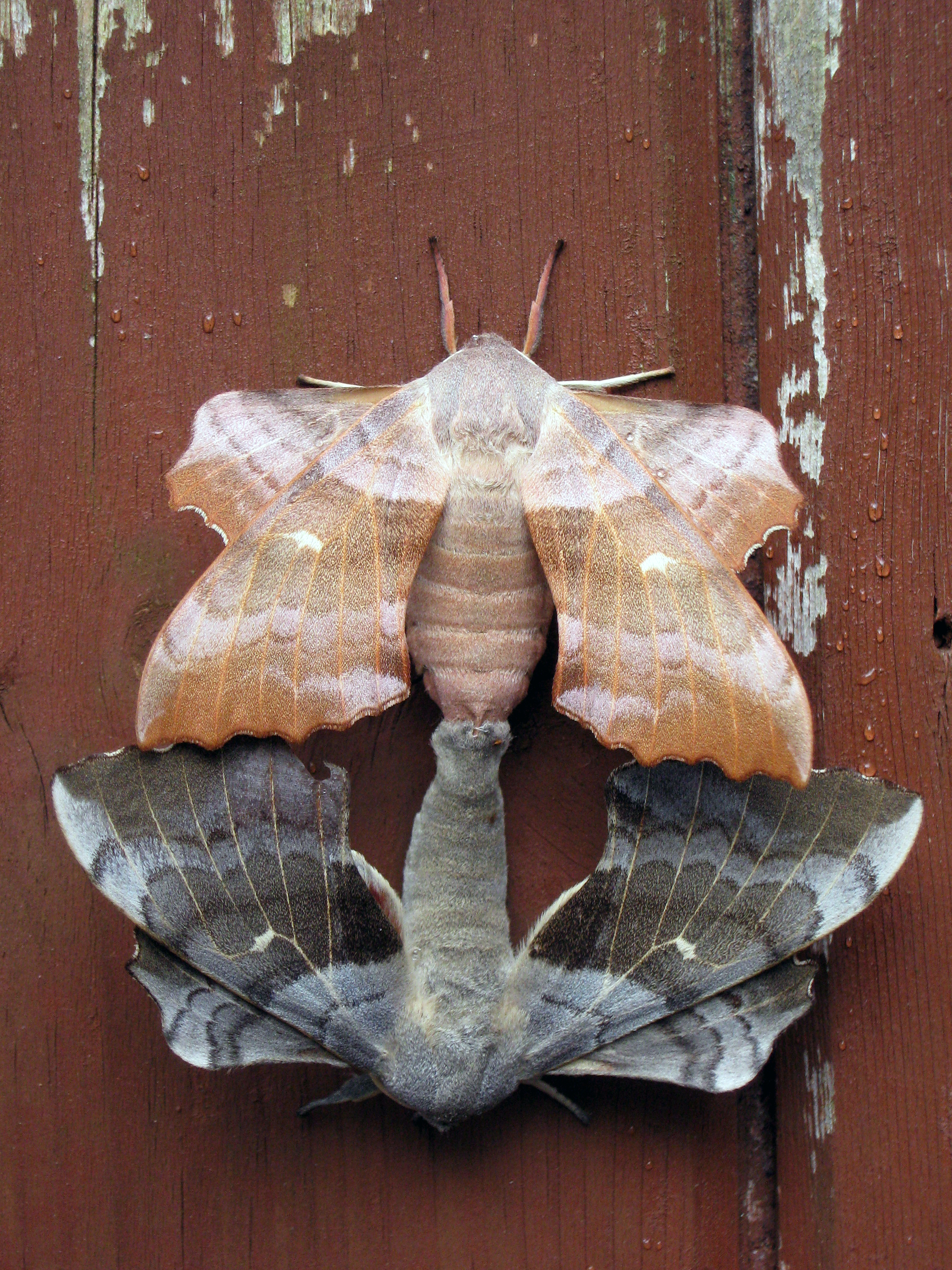
Copulating poplar hawk moth pair

Sex pheromones signal the female animal's readiness to mating. Male animals also emit pheromones; they contain information about sex and genotype. Many insects release sex pheromones; some butterfly species still perceive the pheromone at a distance of 10 kilometers. The sensory cell response in the male silkmoth begins at a concentration of about 1000 molecules per cubic centimeter of air. The scent signal of a female, as soon as a certain concentration threshold is exceeded, initially triggers an oriented headwind flight in the silkmoth male. In other species such as the codling moth, on the other hand, the male tests the stereochemical purity of the attractant molecule. As soon as a small admixture of another stereoisomer is present in the pheromone cocktail, the approach to the source stops. In this case, the other stereoisomer acts as a repellent. In addition to the main components, some species release so-called short-range components in small amounts, which influence the behavioral response. In addition to the main components, some species release so-called short-range components in small amounts.

Fouraging honey bees spread the scent of (Z)-11-eicosen-1-ol. European bee wolves are guided by this scent to prey on honey bees. Male bee wolves use this component, and thus the existing sensory preference of females for bee scent, as part of their sex pheromone cocktail to attract them.

==== Aphrodisiac apheromones ====
Olean - the aphrodisiac apheromone of the olive fruit fly (Bactrocera oleae).

Aphrodisiac pheromones stimulate the readiness to mate. The spiroacetal olean, for example, is the aphrodisiac pheromone of the olive fruit fly (Bactrocera oleae). Only the (R) enantiomer is effective on males; the (S) enantiomer is ineffective on them. The female produces the racemate, responds to (R)- and (S)-olean, and also stimulates herself with it.

So-called anti-aphrodisiacs have exactly the opposite effect. Bedbug nymphs protect themselves with such a pheromone, which has a specific mixing ratio of the aldehydes (E)-2-hexenal, (E)-2-octenal and 4-oxo-(E)-2-hexenal, against mating attempts by male bedbugs. The latter directly drills a hole into the abdomen of sexually mature female bedbugs and injects its sperm there (traumatic insemination). For mated nymphs, however, such injury can be fatal.

==== Alarm pheromones ====
Some insect species emit alarm pheromones when attacked. These trigger either flight or increased aggression. In bees, for example, two alarm pheromone mixtures are known. One is released by the Koshevnikov gland near the sting and contains more than 40 different compounds, such as isoamyl acetate, already described by Butler in its effect, besides butyl acetate, 1-Hexanol, 1-Butanol, 1-Octanol, hexyl acetate, octyl acetate and 2-Nonanol. These components have low molar mass, are volatile, and are the most non-specific of all pheromones. Alarm pheromones are released when a bee stings another animal to attract and entice other bees to attack. Smoke suppresses the effect of alarm pheromones, which is exploited by beekeepers.

The other alarm pheromone of the honey bee contains mainly 2-Heptanone, another volatile substance released by the mandibular glands. This component has a repellent effect on predatory insects. The alarm pheromone cocktail of the bedbug contains unsaturated witch and octenaldehydes, which are perceived as a characteristic sweetish odor in bedbug-infested rooms.

==== Marking and dispersion pheromones ====
Certain insects, such as the cherry fruit fly, mark their oviposition sites in such a way that other females of the same species avoid the site and lay their eggs elsewhere to avoid competition for food among the offspring. Territorial social insects, such as colonies of ants, also mark territories they claim with pheromones.

The marking pheromones include the dispersion pheromones, with which, for example, bark beetles prevent overcolonization of a tree. The females and nymphs of the German cockroach transmit dispersion pheromones in direct contact via their saliva. In the nymphal stage, these serve to deter adult cockroaches and thus protect against cannibalism. In adults, they prevent the translocation of a habitat.

==== Trace pheromones ====
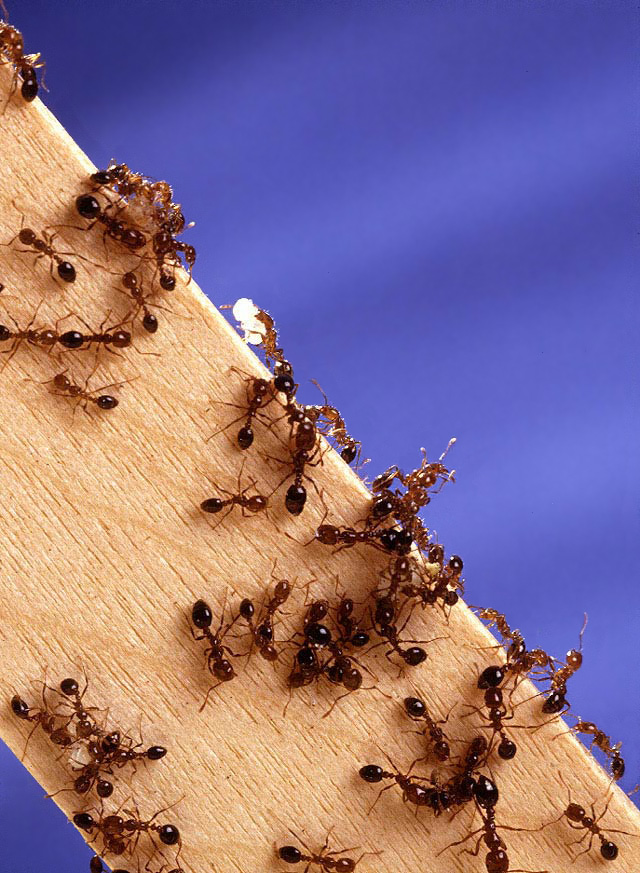
Fire ants use track pheromones to mark the path from the colony to feeding sites.

Trace pheromones are mainly known in insects living in colonies, which mark their paths with low-volatile substances such as higher molecular weight hydrocarbons. Ants in particular often mark the path from a food source to the nest in this way. As long as the food source exists, the trail is renewed. When the food source dries up, the ants spray over the trail pheromone with a repellent pheromone. In 1921, the U.S. naturalist Charles William Beebe reported on the ant mill phenomenon, which trace pheromones can trigger in army ants: If the animals are separated from the main trail of the colony, the blind ants follow the pheromone trails of ants running in front of them. These run in large circles until complete exhaustion or death, without finding their way back to the colony.

==== Recruitment pheromones ====
Recruitment pheromones are widely used as an element of chemical communication in social insects and have been demonstrated for bees, termites, and ants. These pheromones are used by insects to stimulate other members of the colony to forage at a food source. Bumblebees perform a dance similar to the waggle dance primarily to distribute recruitment pheromones.

=== Primerpheromones ===
The order Hymenoptera contains the largest group of eusocial insects, including many bees, especially of the subfamily Apinae, ants, and some species of vespidae, especially of the subfamily of Vespidaes. Characteristics often include the presence of a reproductive queen and castes with specialized workers bees and soldiers. Termites form the second major group of eusocial insects. Colonies are divided into distinct castes, with a queen and king as reproductive individuals, workers, and soldiers defending the colony. Primer pheromones have a major influence on the organization of hymenopteran states formed by Hymenoptera and of termite colonies. These pheromones influence the hormonal system of the recipient; they often interfere with metabolism via a signaling cascade or activate proteins that can bind to DNA. In contrast to the releaser pheromones, the primer pheromones are less well studied. For a long time, only one primer pheromone, 9-ODA, was known.

==== Primer pheromones of bees ====
A well-known example of primer pheromones are the queen bee pheromones. These pheromones control social behavior, comb maintenance, swarming, and ovary formation of worker bees. The components are carboxylic acids and aromatic compounds. (E)-9-oxo-dec-2-enoic acid (9-ODA), for example, suppresses further breeding of queens and inhibits development of ovaries of worker bees. It is also a potent sex pheromone for drones on nuptial flight.

Brood recognition pheromones are emitted by larvae and pupae and discourage worker bees from leaving the hive while there are still offspring to be cared for. Furthermore, they suppress the formation of ovaries in worker bees. The pheromones consist of a mixture of ten fatty acid esters, including glyceryl 1,2-dioleate-3-palmitate. Worker pupae contain 2 to 5, drone pupae about 10 and queen pupae 30 micrograms of the pheromone.

Older, fouraging worker bees release oleic acid ethyl ester, which inhibits the development of nurse bees and makes them care for brood longer. The oleic acid ester acts as a primer pheromone and stabilizes the ratio of brood-caring and food-producing bees. The foragers produce it from nectar mixed with traces of ethanol, which they feed to the nurse bees. This delays their development until the number of older foragers decreases and with it the exposure of nurse bees to ethyl oleate.

==== Caste determinant pheromones ====
The Reticulitermes flavipes uses terpenes such as γ-cadinene and γ-cadinenal as caste-stimulating or -inhibiting primerpheromones. These assist the juvenile hormone in determining the position of totipotent workers in the caste system. In ants, female larvae possess bipotentiality for some time and thus the possibility of developing as either queens or workers. At some point in larval development, continued feeding determines the fate of the larva. If the juvenile hormone titer is raised above a certain threshold, gynomorphs develop; otherwise, workers develop. Control of larval feeding is governed by a primerpheromone of the queen ant.

== Application ==
In the 19th century, Lymantria dispar escaped from entomologist Étienne Léopold Trouvelot in Massachusetts and spread throughout the United States by the mid-20th century, becoming one of the most feared pests today. As early as 1898, Edward Forbush and Charles Fernald made attempts to control the population of the gypsy moth by luring males into traps set with attractant females. The United States Department of Agriculture continued these attempts in the 1930s, using extracts of female abdominal spikes to attract male moths. The United States Department of Agriculture was the first to use this method. The application of insect pheromones in pest control has been intensively studied, especially since the first syntheses, with the aim of developing environmentally friendly methods to control population dynamics.

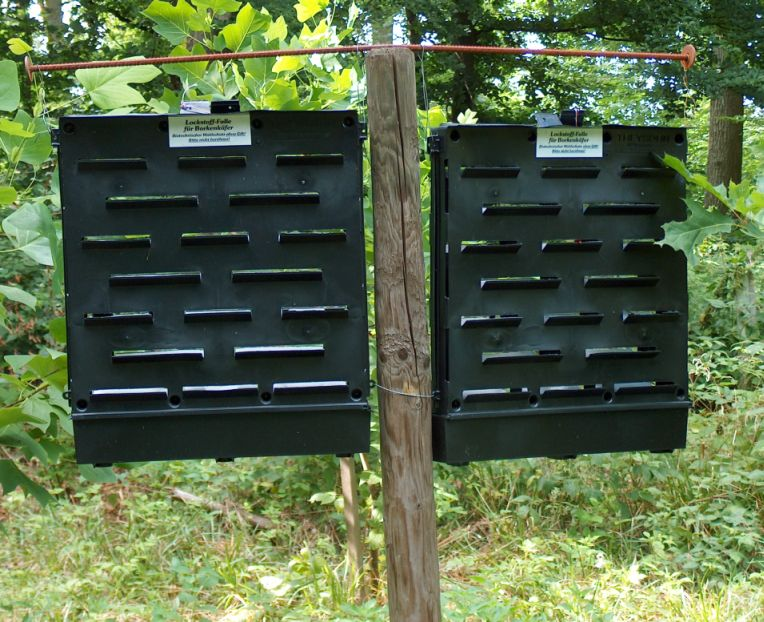
Insect trap for bark beetles

In pest control, the use of pheromones in attractant traps to control insects is common practice. This can involve attracting the insects to kill them with an insecticide or physically to trap them or for monitoring. Bark beetles are attracted with aggregation pheromones to trap them. The attractant is usually released when drilling into spruce wood, signaling that the tree can be colonized. The bark beetle trap is an important tool for controlling bark beetles. However, the use of attractant traps poses the problem that the pheromone may act as a kairomone and thus attract predatory insects. By reducing the population of natural predators of the bark beetle, the pheromone trap has a counterproductive effect in this case. Monitoring by means of attractant traps, such as window traps, is used for the quantitative detection of pests to control them more specifically with insecticides depending on the activity detected. In addition, they are used in the identification of new species.

Trap beetles work on the same principle as attractant traps. The bark beetles of the initial infestation attract further conspecifics by aggregation pheromones. Windthrow is suitable as trap beetles, which can be equipped with pheromone dispensers to enhance the attraction effect. Trees prepared in this way divert approaching bark beetles from the stand and bind them to controllable stems. The use of trap trees requires regular inspection of the trees. When larval galleries appear, the trees are debarked and larvae and pupae dry out. If necessary, the infested tree may be treated with insecticides or burned to prevent escape of the next generation.

Egg-laying-preventing marking pheromones are widely used in the insect world. Various experiments have demonstrated the possibility of controlling population dynamics by these pheromones. Application of the oviposition-preventing marking pheromone of Rhagoletis cerasi, which cannot be controlled with yellow boards, for example, reduced infestations of cherries by 90%.

Another application is the confusion method or mating disruption. Here, a high substance concentration of artificially produced pheromones is applied. This makes it impossible for the males to follow the pheromones of the females, thus hindering the reproduction of the pest. The confusion method has a species-specific effect. It is usually successful with respect to one species if sufficient dispensers are applied, but in some cases related species occupy the ecological niche that is released.

Bees use the Nasanov pheromone to guide worker bees back to the hive. The pheromone contains terpenes such as geraniol and citral. Beekeepers use a man-made product to attract bees to an unused hive. The process is suitable for trapping Africanized honey bees in trap boxes.

== Toxicology ==
Toxicological studies were mainly carried out in connection with the approval of pheromone traps and dispensers. A health hazard cannot be generally assessed due to the large chemical diversity of pheromones, but is usually excluded because only small amounts are emitted. However, in higher doses, orally administered pheromones such as cantharidin cause death in rare cases.

== Evidence ==
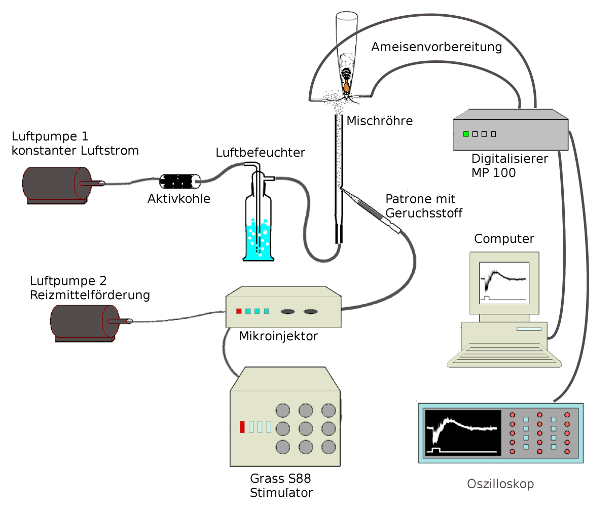
Recording of an electroantennogram as a function of scent current concentration.

Commercial application in crop protection intensified the study of pheromones and led to the development of highly sensitive analytical methods. The identification of a pheromone proceeds through several steps. First, an extract of the pheromone is obtained. This is done by the method already used by Butenandt of extracting glands or whole animals with an easily evaporated solvent, ideally at the time of high pheromone production. Alternatively, the pheromone is adsorbed on activated carbon from the gas phase and an extract is obtained with little solvent. For very small traces, solid-phase microextraction is suitable. For identification, the extracts or the solid-phase microextraction samples are analyzed by gas chromatography-mass spectrometry.

The electroantennogram technique is suitable for studying the biological activity of insect pheromones. In this technique, an electrode inserted into the antenna main stem and an antenna branch measures the change in electrical voltage as a function of the concentration of pheromone molecules impinging on the antenna, which are transported to the antenna in a defined manner by an air current. [58] By varying the pheromone molecule, the influence of certain functional groups interacting with the chiral elements of the receptors can be determined.

The coupling of gas chromatography and electroantennogram allows the biological activity of the compounds present in an extract to be verified. The shape of the electroantennogram depends on the fragrance component in the air stream, and the amplitude increases with the concentration and flow velocity of the air.

== Bibliography ==
- Edward O. Wilson, W. H. Bossert (1963): Chemical communication among animals. In: Recent Progress in Hormone Research. Bd. 19, S. 673–716, PMID 14284035
- Hans Jürgen Bestmann, Otto Vostrowsky (1993): Chemische Informationssysteme der Natur: Insektenpheromone. In: Chemie in unserer Zeit. Bd. 27, Nr. 3, S. 127–133, doi:10.1002/ciuz.19930270304
- Stefan Schulz: The Chemistry of Pheromones and Other Semiochemicals II. Springer, 2005, ISBN 3-540-21308-2
- R. T. Carde, A. K. Minks: Insect Pheromone Research: New Directions. Springer, 1997, ISBN 978-0-412-99611-5
