= Fragrance compound =

Chemical compound that has a smell or odor

"Grapefruit mercaptan" can be detected by humans at the ppt level.

A fragrance compound (or fragrance) is a chemical compound with a pleasant odor. Fragrances affect only the sense of smell, whereas flavors can affect both the sense of taste and smell. Fragrances are often mixtures of individual fragrance compounds. Although many fragrances are derived from natural sources, many are synthetic. Fragrances are widely used in cosmetics and are the basis for a large industry.

== Related odiferous compounds ==
Stench compounds have unpleasant odors. Some are used as odorizer or an odorant usually have an intense odor, which may be pleasant or not. They are sometimes used to confer a detectable odor to an odorless substance, like propane, natural gas, or hydrogen, as a safety measure.

== Occurrence ==
For an individual chemical or class of chemical compounds to impart a smell or fragrance, it must be sufficiently volatile for transmission via the air to the olfactory system in the upper part of the nose. A 1976 analysis of 2,000 food aroma compounds found a peak in molecular weights around 135–155 and an upper limit near 310, with the most potent compounds all weighing less than 200 Da. A 2003 paper claims the sharp cutoff near 300 Da is instead attributable to the size limitations of olfactory receptors, with higher rates of anosmia for compounds close to this limit such as galaxolide.

Fragrance compounds are found in various foods, such as fruits and their peels, wine, spices, floral scent, perfumes, fragrance oils, and essential oils. For example, many form during the ripening of fruits and other crops. Wines have more than 100 aromas that form as byproducts of fermentation. Also, many of the aroma compounds play a significant role in the production of compounds used in the food service industry to flavor, improve, and generally increase the appeal of their products.

== History, biochemistry, economics ==
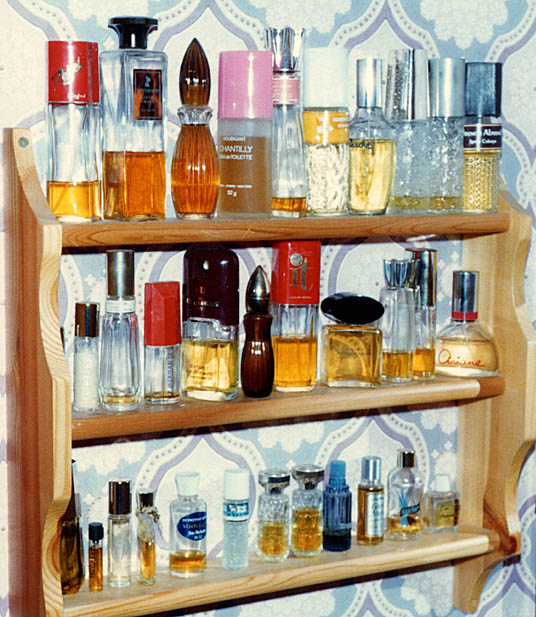
Fragrance bottles

The technology of fragrances came with the invention of distillation, which allowed to be concentrated and sometimes even separated into individual components. The purification of cinnamaldehyde, the first single component fragrance, marked the beginning of the fragrance and flavor industries. Other single component fragrance compounds that were purified in the 19th century include benzaldehyde, methyl salicylate (oil of wintergreen), and vanillin. Somewhat in step with the synthetic dye industry, the fragrance and flavor industry was established. Many fragrance compounds were prepared synthetically. Spectroscopic methods coupled with various separation techniques allowed the identification of traces of aroma compounds (e.g. in wines, flower extracts, etc.). Tetramethyl acetyloctahydronaphthalenes have been described as "the most successful synthetic fragrance".

The invention of gas chromatography was very important to the development of fragrances. Gas chromatography-olfactometry sometimes involving a human operator sniffing the GC effluent is particularly relevant to the analysis of fragrances. GC-O and related techniques have also been developed to characterize individual enantiomers of chiral aromatic compounds.

Studies on synthetic musk reveal that the odors of some compounds are noticeably affected by deuteration.

Various fragrant fruits are commercially cultivated to have appealing or intensified aromas.

== Fragrance compounds classified by chemical structure ==
In 2010, the International Fragrance Association published a list of 3,059 chemicals used in 2011 based on a voluntary survey of its members, identifying about 90% of the world's production volume of fragrances.

=== Esters ===
Compound name	Fragrance	Natural occurrence	Chemical structure
Geranyl acetate	Fruity, Floral	Rose	
Methyl formate	Ethereal	synthetic	
Methyl acetate	Sweet, nail polish Solvent	synthetic	
Fructone	fruity, apple-like	synthetic	
Ethyl methylphenylglycidate	Strawberry	synthetic	
Methyl propionate	Sweet, fruity, rum-like		
Methyl butyrate	Fruity	Apple; Pineapple	
Ethyl acetate	Sweet, solvent	Wine	
Ethyl butyrate	Fruity	Orange, Pineapple	
Isoamyl acetate	Fruity, Banana, Pear	Banana plant	
Pentyl butyrate	Fruity	Pear; Apricot	
Pentyl pentanoate	Fruity	Apple	
Octyl acetate	Fruity	Orange	
Benzyl acetate	Fruity, Strawberry	Strawberries	
Methyl anthranilate	Fruity	Grape	
Methyl salicylate	Minty, root beer	Wintergreen	
Hexyl acetate	Floral, Fruity	Apple, Plum	

=== Linear terpenes ===
Compound name	Fragrance	Natural occurrence	Chemical structure
Myrcene	Woody, complex	Verbena, Bay leaf	
Geraniol	Rose, flowery	Geranium, Lemon	
Nerol	Sweet rose, flowery	Neroli, Lemongrass	
Citral, lemonal Geranial, neral	Lemon	Lemon myrtle, Lemongrass	
Citronellal	Lemon	Lemongrass	
Citronellol	Lemon	Lemongrass, rose Pelargonium	
Linalool	Floral, sweet Woody	Coriander, Sweet basil, Lavender, Honeysuckle	
Nerolidol	Woody, fresh bark	Neroli, ginger Jasmine	
Ocimene	Fruity, Floral	Mango, Curcuma amada	

=== Cyclic terpenes ===
Compound name	Fragrance	Natural occurrence	Chemical structure
Limonene	Orange	Orange, lemon	
Camphor	Camphor	Camphor laurel	
Menthol	Menthol	Mentha	
Carvone^{1}	Caraway or Spearmint	Caraway, dill, spearmint	
Terpineol	Lilac	Lilac, cajuput	
alpha-Ionone	Violet, woody	Violet	
Thujone	Minty	Wormwood, lilac, juniper	
Eucalyptol	Eucalyptus	Eucalyptus	
Jasmone	spicy, fruity, floral in dilution	Jasmine, Honeysuckle	

Note: Carvone, depending on its chirality, offers two different smells.

=== Aromatic ===
Compound name	Fragrance	Natural occurrence	Chemical structure
Benzaldehyde	Almond	Bitter almond	
Eugenol	Clove	Clove	
Cinnamaldehyde	Cinnamon	Cassia; Cinnamon	
Ethyl maltol	Cooked fruit Caramelized sugar		
Vanillin	Vanilla	Vanilla	
Anisole	Anise	Anise	
Anethole	Anise	Anise; Sweet basil	
Estragole	Tarragon	Tarragon	
Thymol	Thyme	Thyme	

== Other aroma compounds ==
=== Alcohols ===
- Furaneol (strawberry)
- 1-Hexanol (herbaceous, woody)
- cis-3-Hexen-1-ol (fresh cut grass)

=== Aldehydes ===
High concentrations of aldehydes tend to be very pungent and overwhelming, but low concentrations can evoke a wide range of aromas.

- Acetaldehyde (ethereal)
- Hexanal (green, grassy)
- cis-3-Hexenal (green tomatoes)
- Furfural (burnt oats)
- Hexyl cinnamaldehyde
- Isovaleraldehyde – nutty, fruity, cocoa-like
- Anisic aldehyde – floral, sweet, hawthorn. It is a crucial component of chocolate, vanilla, strawberry, raspberry, apricot, and others.
- Cuminaldehyde – Spicy, cumin-like, green

=== Ketones ===
- Dihydrojasmone (fruity woody floral)
- Oct-1-en-3-one (blood, metallic, mushroom-like)
- 2-Acetyl-1-pyrroline (fresh bread, jasmine rice)
- 6-Acetyl-2,3,4,5-tetrahydropyridine (fresh bread, tortillas, popcorn)
- Diacetyl (butter flavor)
- Acetoin (butter flavor)

=== Lactones ===
- gamma-Decalactone intense peach flavor
- gamma-Nonalactone coconut odor, popular in suntan lotions
- delta-Octalactone creamy note
- Jasmine lactone powerful fatty-fruity peach and apricot
- Massoia lactone powerful creamy coconut
- Wine lactone sweet coconut odor
- Sotolon (maple syrup, curry, fenugreek)

== Detection and interpretation ==
Fragrances are detected by the nose when the movement of inspired air contacts olfactory sensory neurons, which in humans, number between 6 and 10 million over a surface area of 2.5 cm^{2} (0.39 sq in) of olfactory epithelium. Fragrance signals are conveyed from the epithelium to the olfactory nerves, and then to the olfactory bulbs, which relay neural impulses about fragrance properties into the primary olfactory cortex of the brain. In the olfactory cortex, fragrance characteristics are integrated to evaluate the safety and appeal of compounds to be ingested, and to recognize environmental and social factors associated by memory with the fragrance.

== Safety and regulation ==
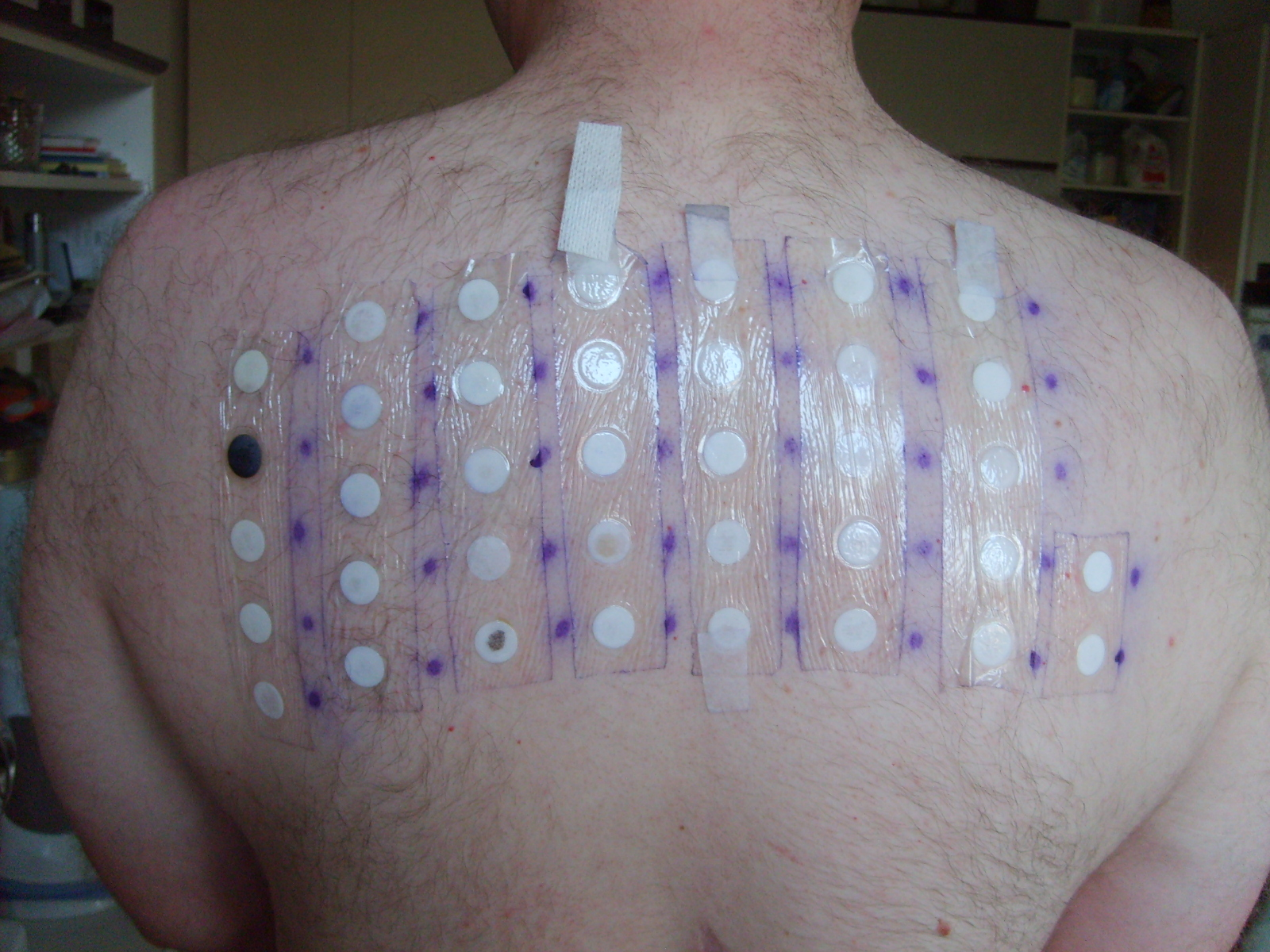
Patch test

In 2005–06, fragrance mix was the third-most-prevalent allergen in USA patch tests (11.5%). 'Fragrance' was voted Allergen of the Year in 2007 by the American Contact Dermatitis Society. An academic study in the United States published in 2016 has shown that "34.7 % of the population reported health problems, such as migraine headaches and respiratory difficulties, when exposed to fragranced products".

The composition of fragrances is usually not disclosed in the label of the products, hiding the actual chemicals of the formula, which raises concerns among some consumers. In the United States, this is because the law regulating cosmetics protects trade secrets.

In the United States, fragrances are regulated by the Food and Drug Administration if present in cosmetics or drugs, by the Consumer Product Safety Commission if present in consumer products. No pre-market approval is required, except for drugs. Fragrances are also generally regulated by the Toxic Substances Control Act of 1976 that "grandfathered" existing chemicals without further review or testing and put the burden of proof that a new substance is not safe on the EPA. The EPA, however, does not conduct independent safety testing but relies on data provided by the manufacturer.

A 2019 study of the top-selling skin moisturizers found 45% of those marketed as "fragrance-free" contained fragrance.

Cosmetics are regulated in the United Kingdom and the composition of products must be provided.

== See also ==
- Aroma of wine
- Eau de toilette
- Flavour and Fragrance Journal
- Fragrances of the World
- Foodpairing
- Odor
- Odor detection threshold
- Odorizer, a device for adding an odorant to gas flowing through a pipe
- Olfaction
- Olfactory receptor
- Olfactory system
- Pheromone
- The Hundred Year Lie
- Vabbing
