= E2D =

E2D may refer to:

- Estradiol decanoate
- trans-4,5-Epoxy-(E)-2-decenal
- E2-D the fourth variant of the Northrop Grumman E-2 Hawkeye reconnaissance plane.
