= Geranial dehydrogenase =

Identifiers
- EC no.: 1.2.1.86

Databases
- IntEnz: IntEnz view
- BRENDA: BRENDA entry
- ExPASy: NiceZyme view
- KEGG: KEGG entry
- MetaCyc: metabolic pathway
- PRIAM: profile
- PDB structures: RCSB PDB PDBe PDBsum
Search
- PMC: articles
- PubMed: articles
- NCBI: proteins

Geranial dehydrogenase (EC 1.2.1.86, GaDH, geoB (gene)) is an enzyme with systematic name geranial:NAD^{+} oxidoreductase. This enzyme catalyses the following chemical reaction

geranial
+ NAD^{+}
H_{2}O
H^{+}
H_{2}O
H^{+}
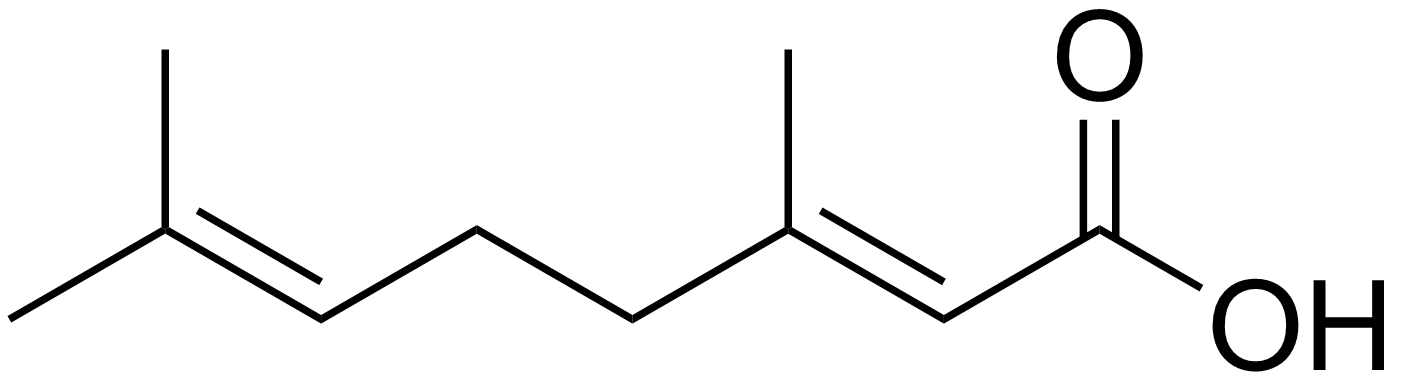
geranic acid
+ NADH

The enzyme does not act on neral, the Z-isomer of geranial.
