= Adolf Butenandt =

German biochemist (1903–1995)

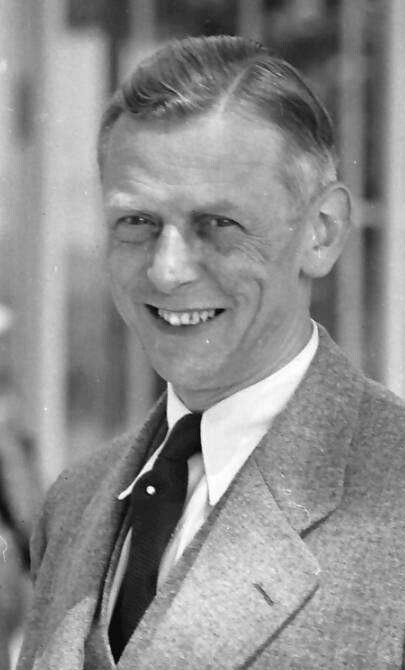
- Adolf Friedrich Johann Butenandt in 1951
- Born: 24 March 1903; Lehe, Province of Hanover, Kingdom of Prussia, German Empire (now Bremerhaven, Bremen, Germany)
- Died: 18 January 1995 (aged 91); Munich, Germany
- Awards: Nobel Prize for Chemistry (1939); Kriegsverdienstkreuz (1942)
- Scientific career
- Fields: Organic and biochemistry
- Workplaces: Kaiser Wilhelm Institute / Max Planck Institute for Biochemistry; Technical University of Danzig
- Thesis: Untersuchungen über das Rotenon, den physiologisch wirksamen Bestandteil der Derris elliptica (1928)
- Doctoral advisor: Adolf Windaus

Adolf Friedrich Johann Butenandt (German pronunciation: [ˈaːdɔlf ˈbuːtənant]; 24 March 1903, Lehe near Bremerhaven – 18 January 1995, Munich) was a German biochemist. He was awarded the Nobel Prize in Chemistry in 1939 for his "work on sex hormones." He initially rejected the award in accordance with government policy, but accepted it in 1949 after World War II. He was President of the Max Planck Society from 1960 to 1972. He was also the first, in 1959, to discover the structure of the sex pheromone of silkworms, which he named bombykol.

== Education and early life ==
Born in Lehe, near Bremerhaven, he started his studies at Marburg University. For his PhD, he joined the working group of the Nobel laureate Adolf Windaus at the University of Göttingen and he finished his studies with a PhD in chemistry in 1927. His doctoral research was on the chemistry of the insecticidal toxin found in the roots of Derris elliptica which he isolated and characterized. After his Habilitation he became lecturer in Göttingen 1931.

== Professional career ==
He became a professor ordinarius at the Technical University of Danzig from 1933 until 1936. In 1933, Butenandt signed the Vow of allegiance of the Professors of the German Universities and High-Schools to Adolf Hitler and the National Socialistic State. In 1936, he applied for the directorship of the Kaiser Wilhelm Institut (later the Max Planck Institute for Biochemistry) in Berlin-Dahlem while also joining the NSDAP on 1 May 1936 (party member No. 3716562). The earlier director of the Kaiser Wilhelm institute was Carl Neuberg, who had been removed for being a Jew. His work on rotenones was considered useful by the Nazi leadership as it could be useful for controlling lice among soldiers in the trenches. As the head of a leading institute, he applied for government funding on concentrated research labeled kriegswichtig (important for the war), some of which focused on military projects like the improvement of oxygen uptake for high-altitude bomber pilots.

Estrone

Adolf Windaus and Walter Schöller of Schering gave him the advice to work on hormones extracted from ovaries. This research lead to the discovery of estrone and other primary female sex hormones, which were extracted from several thousand liters of urine. While working as professor in Danzig at the Chemisches Institut he was continuing his works over hormones extracting progesterone in 1934 and testosterone a year later, the research results were along with the synthesis of steroids by Leopold Ružička considered significant enough to be awarded later by Nobel Committee in 1939. In 1940 he was involved in research on a hormone treatment to make long submarine voyages more comfortable for submariners in the Kriegsmarine.

Butenand's involvement with the Nazi regime and various themes of research led to criticism after the war, and even after his death the exact nature of his political orientation during the Nazi era has never been fully resolved. When the institute moved to Tübingen in 1945 he became a professor at the University of Tübingen. In 1948, he was considered for the chair for physiological medicine at the University of Basel. He entered in negotiations but eventually was convinced by the chemical industry to stay in Germany. In 1956, when the institute relocated to Martinsried, a suburb of Munich, Butenandt became a professor at the Ludwig-Maximilians-Universität München. He also served as president of the Max Planck Society for the Advancement of Science following Otto Hahn from 1960 to 1972.

Butenandt is credited with the discovery and naming of the silkworm moth pheromone Bombykol in 1959.

Butenandt died in Munich in 1995, at the age of 91. His wife Erika, born in 1906, died in 1995 at 88. They had seven children.

== Honours and awards ==
- 1939: Nobel Prize in Chemistry (shared with Leopold Ruzicka) for the identification of the sex hormones, oestrogen, progesterone and androsterone
- 1942: War Merit Cross, Second Class (Germany)
- 1943: War Merit Cross, First Class (Germany)
- 1953: Paul Ehrlich and Ludwig Darmstaedter Prize
- 1959/1964: Knight Commander's Cross and Grand Cross of the Order of Merit of the Federal Republic of Germany
- 1960: Honorary Citizen of the City of Bremerhaven
- 1960: President of the Max Planck Society
- 1961: Wilhelm Normann Medal of the German Society for Fat Research
- 1962: Bavarian Order of Merit
- 1962: Pour le Mérite
- 1964: Austrian Decoration for Science and Art
- 1967: Cultural Honor Prize of the City of Munich
- 1969: Commander of the French Legion of Honour
- 1972: Ordre des Palmes Académiques
- 1981: Bavarian Maximilian Order for Science and Art
- 1985: Grand Cross 1st class of the Order of Merit of the Federal Republic of Germany
- 1985: Honorary Citizen of the City of Munich
- 1994: Grand Gold Decoration for Services to the Republic of Austria
- 1951–1992: 31 participations in the Lindau Nobel Laureate Meetings (record)

=== Honorary doctorates ===
Butenandt received 14 honorary doctorates, including the University of Tübingen (1949), the Ludwig-Maximilians-Universität München (1950), the University of Graz (1957), the University of Leeds (1961), Aristotle University of Thessaloniki (1961), Complutense University of Madrid (1963), the University of Vienna (1965), Saint Louis University (1965), the Humboldt University of Berlin (1966), the University of Cambridge (1966) and Gdańsk University of Technology (1994).

== See also ==
- Androsterone
- Conjugated estriol
- Epiandrosterone
- Pregnenolone

== Bibliography ==
- Angelika Ebbinghaus, Karl-Heinz Roth (2002). "Von der Rockefeller Foundation zur Kaiser-Wilhelm/Max-Planck-Gesellschaft: Adolf Butenandt als Biochemiker und Wissenschaftspolitiker des 20. Jahrhunderts". Zeitschrift für Geschichtswissenschaft. 50 (5): 389–418.Schieder, Wolfgang (2004). Adolf Butenandt und die Kaiser-Wilhelm-Gesellschaft: Wissenschaft, Industrie und Politik im "Dritten Reich". Göttingen: Wallstein-Verlag. p. 450. ISBN 3-89244-752-7.
