= Revolutsionnyi vostok =

Theoretical journal in the Soviet Union (1927–1938)

- Categories: Political magazine
- Frequency: Monthly
- Publisher: Communist University of the Toilers of the East
- Founded: 1927
- Final issue: 1938
- Country: Soviet Union
- Based in: Moscow
- Language: Russian

Revolutsionnyi vostok (Russian: Революционный восток, lit. 'Revolutionary East') was a monthly theoretical journal which was published by the Communist University of the Toilers of the East (KUTV) between 1927 and 1938 in Moscow. It was one of the major Orientalist publications in the Soviet Union.

== History and profile ==
Revolutsionnyi vostok was launched by the KUTV in 1927. It came out monthly and was headquartered in Moscow. In the second issue the journal featured the Russian translation of the first chapter of the Mao Zedong's Hunan report which described the details of the Chinese peasant movement. In 1929 the journal published articles in which Nikolai Nasonov and Endre Sík discussed the distinct understandings of race based on Marxism. The journal folded in 1938.
