= Nasonov pheromone =

Scent released by worker bees to orient forager bee

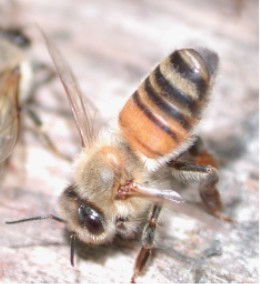
Fanning honeybee exposes Nasonov's gland (white – at tip of abdomen) releasing pheromone to entice swarm into an empty hive

The Nasonov (alternatively, Nasanov) pheromone is released by worker bees to orient returning forager bees back to the colony. To broadcast this scent, bees raise their abdomens, which contain the Nasonov glands, and fan their wings vigorously.

Nasonov includes a number of different terpenoids including geraniol, nerolic acid, citral and geranic acid. Bees use these to find the entrance to their colony or hive, and they release them on flowers so other bees know which flowers have nectar. Once the foraging bee leaves the nest it uses its sense from special sensing cells on the antennae to locate and distinguish forage plants, which each give off a unique blend of odour chemicals. When a beekeeper lifts out frames from a hive they disturb the balance of smells within the hive. It can take up to 48 hours for the colony to re-establish its scent equilibrium.

A synthetically produced Nasonov pheromone can be used to attract a honey bee swarm to an unoccupied hive or a swarm-catching box. Synthetically produced Nasonov consists of citral and geraniol in a 2:1 ratio.

The Nasonov gland was first described in 1882 by the Russian zoologist Nikolai Viktorovich Nasonov. Nasonov thought that the gland performed perspiration; it was Frederick William Lambert Sladen (May 30, 1876 - 1921) of England who in 1901 first proposed that the gland produced a pheromone.

== See also ==
- Nasonov's gland
