= The Hundred Year Lie =

Book by Randall Fitzgerald

- Author: Randall Fitzgerald
- Language: English
- Genre: Non-fiction
- Publication date: 2006
- Publication place: United States
- Media type: Print (hardback)
- ISBN: 0-525-94951-8

The Hundred Year Lie: How Food And Medicine Are Destroying Your Health (2006) is a book by investigative journalist Randall Fitzgerald that examines the rise of the local and global influence of the United States food and chemical industries, and argues that they have, over the last century, altered, affected and damaged the lives of millions of people in the United States by introducing synthetic chemicals into the mainstream food chain.

== Summary ==
The book covers a wide range of topics related to the central issue. It starts by describing the myths that the public believes, that toxicity health issues are 'someone else's problem', and then goes on to talk about what is known to the scientific and chemical communities, and charts the history of the cover-up of chemicals in relation to human health, and the level of business made from this by the chemical companies.

The book then goes on in detail about the dangers of food additives, the toxic threats of the processed food humans and animals currently eat, and how this chemical contamination has now affected the water that people drink, and how this has brought on increased biological changes, genetic mutations and newly discovered and increasing illnesses and diseases, in both human and animals.

The book ends with a discussion on Western and Eastern medical approaches and philosophies, a focus on alternative medicine and eating healthily, avoiding synthetic foods, and a practical guide on how to detoxify one's body.

== Editions ==
- ISBN 0-525-94951-8 (hardback edition 2006, 304pp.)

== See also ==
- Super Size Me — a 2004 documentary by Morgan Spurlock on a similar topic.
- The Corporation — a 2003 Canadian documentary film critical of the modern-day corporation and its behavior towards society.
- The Jungle — a 1906 novel by Upton Sinclair on the meatpacking industry. Fast Food Nation makes various references to it.
- Reefer Madness — a 2003 book by Eric Schlosser examining migrant labor and the pornography and marijuana businesses in America.
- Fast Food Nation — a 2001 book by Eric Schlosser examining fast food businesses in America.
