= Bombykol =

Sex pheromone of silk moths

Names
- Preferred IUPAC name (10E,12Z)-Hexadeca-10,12-dien-1-ol

Identifiers
CAS Number	765-17-3
3D model (JSmol)	Interactive image; Interactive image
ChEBI	CHEBI:41200
ChemSpider	392860
PubChem CID	445128
UNII	LZT8R8TVZ7
CompTox Dashboard (EPA)	DTXSID00894769
- InChI: InChI=1S/C16H30O/c1-2-3-4-5-6-7-8-9-10-11-12-13-14-15-16-17/h4-7,17H,2-3,8-16H2,1H3/b5-4-,7-6+ Key: CIVIWCVVOFNUST-SCFJQAPRSA-N; InChI=1/C16H30O/c1-2-3-4-5-6-7-8-9-10-11-12-13-14-15-16-17/h4-7,17H,2-3,8-16H2,1H3/b5-4-,7-6+ Key: CIVIWCVVOFNUST-SCFJQAPRBG
- SMILES: CCC/C=C\C=C\CCCCCCCCCO; OCCCCCCCCC\C=C\C=C/CCC

Properties
Chemical formula	C_{16}H_{30}O
Molar mass	238.415 g·mol^{−1}
- Except where otherwise noted, data are given for materials in their standard state (at 25 °C [77 °F], 100 kPa). verify (what is ?) Infobox references

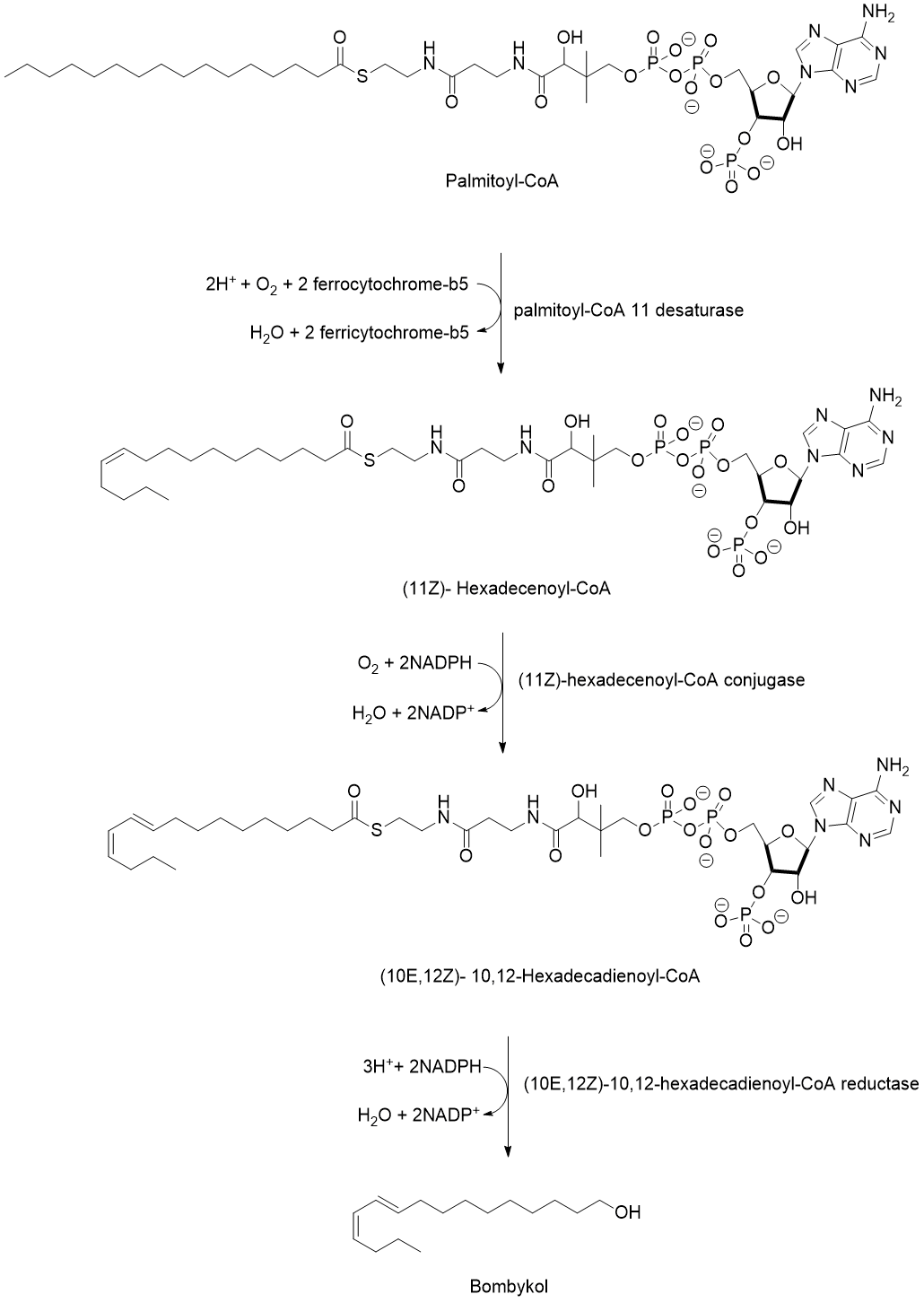
Biosynthesis of bombykol starting from palmitoyl-CoA

Bombykol is a pheromone released by the female silkworm moth to attract mates. It is also the sex pheromone in the wild silk moth (Bombyx mandarina). Discovered by Adolf Butenandt in 1959, it was the first pheromone to be characterized chemically.

Minute quantities of this pheromone can be used per acre of land to confuse male insects about the location of their female partners. It can thus serve as a lure in traps to remove insects effectively without spraying crops with large amounts of pesticides. Butenandt named the substance after the moth's Latin name Bombyx mori.

In vivo it appears that bombykol is the natural ligand for a pheromone binding protein, BmorPBP, which escorts the pheromone to the pheromone receptor.

== Biosynthesis ==
Bombykol is known to be derived from acetyl-CoA via the C-16 fatty acyl palmitoyl-CoA. Palmitoyl-CoA is converted to bombykol in steps that involve desaturation and reductive modification of the carbonyl carbon. Compared to other Type I pheromones, bombykol biosynthesis does not need chain-shortening or any other kind of modification of the terminal hydroxyl group.

A desaturase enzyme encoded by the gene Bmpgdesat1 (Desat1), produces the monoene (11Z)-hexadecenoyl-CoA as well as the diene (10E,12Z)-10,12-hexadecadienoyl-CoA. This desaturase is the only enzyme necessary to catalyze these two consecutive desaturation steps.

The bombykol acyl precursor (10E,12Z)-10,12-hexadecadienoate is primarily found as a triacylglycerol ester in the cytoplasmic lipid droplets of pheromone gland cells of the moth. And when the adult females emerge from their pupae, the neurohormone PBAN (pheromone biosynthesis-activating neuropeptide) start signaling events that help control the lipolysis of the stored triacylglycerols, releasing (10E,12Z)-10,12-hexadecadienoate for its final reductive modification. The mechanism of the lipolytic release of (10E,12Z)-10,12-hexadecadienoate from triacylglycerols is not completely known but the candidate lipase-encoding genes have been identified.
