= Nikolai Nasonov =

Russian and Soviet zoologist (1855–1939)

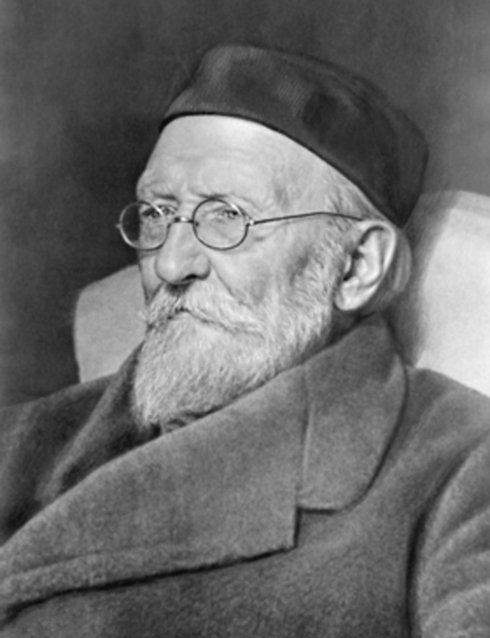
- Born: 14 February 1855; Moscow, Russian Empire
- Died: 11 February 1939 (aged 83); Moscow, USSR
- Education: Moscow State University
- Known for: Nasonov pheromone, Nasonov's gland

Nikolai Viktorovich Nasonov (Russian: Николай Викторович Насонов; 14 February 1855 – 11 February 1939) was a Russian and Soviet zoologist. In 1879 he graduated from the Imperial Moscow University and became an assistant at its Zoological Museum. After defending his PhD in 1887 he lectured at his alma mater, and later worked in Trieste, Marseille and Warsaw. In 1890 he defended a habilitation on the evolution of ants. In December 1897 he was elected as a corresponding and in March 1906 as a full member of the Russian Academy of Sciences. In addition to his studies in zoology Nasonov also dealt with the race problem based on Marxism and published articles in Revolutsionnyi vostok, a monthly journal published by the Communist University of the Toilers of the East. His articles criticized the approach of Endre Sík towards race.

All his four children became prominent scientists: sons Arseny, Dmitri and Vsevolod in history, biology and engineering, respectively, and daughter Antonina in the history of art.
