= Jasmine lactone =

Names
- IUPAC name 6-[(Z)-Pent-2-enyl]oxan-2-one
- Other names (Z)-7-Decen-5-olide

Identifiers
CAS Number	25524-95-2
3D model (JSmol)	Interactive image
ChemSpider	4509494
ECHA InfoCard	100.042.780
EC Number	247-074-2
PubChem CID	5352626
UNII	H8558L43SR
CompTox Dashboard (EPA)	DTXSID30904360
- InChI: InChI=1S/C10H16O2/c1-2-3-4-6-9-7-5-8-10(11)12-9/h3-4,9H,2,5-8H2,1H3/b4-3- Key: XPPALVZZCMPTIV-ARJAWSKDSA-N; InChI=1S/C10H16O2/c1-2-3-4-6-9-7-5-8-10(11)12-9/h3-4,9H,2,5-8H2,1H3/b4-3- Key: XPPALVZZCMPTIV-ARJAWSKDSA-N
- SMILES: CC/C=C\CC1CCCC(=O)O1

Properties
Chemical formula	C_{10}H_{16}O_{2}
Molar mass	168.236 g·mol^{−1}
Appearance	Colorless to pale yellow liquid
Boiling point	248 °C (478 °F; 521 K)
- Except where otherwise noted, data are given for materials in their standard state (at 25 °C [77 °F], 100 kPa). (what is ?) Infobox references

Jasmine lactone is a lactone and aroma compound with a powerful fatty-fruity peach and apricot flavor. Its chemical formula is C_{10}H_{16}O_{2}. It occurs naturally in jasmine oil, tuberose, gardenia, mimosa, honeysuckle, lily, tea, peach, and ginger. It is used as a food spice and is mainly used for the preparation of apricot, peach, dairy products, and as a tropical fruit flavor.
