= Nerolic acid =

Names
- Preferred IUPAC name (2Z)-3,7-Dimethylocta-2,6-dienoic acid
- Other names Neric acid; 3,7-Dimethylocta-2,6-dienoic acid; 3,7-Dimethyl-2,6-octadienoic acid,

Identifiers
CAS Number	4613-38-1
3D model (JSmol)	Interactive image
ChemSpider	4472008
EC Number	202-058-4
PubChem CID	5275520
UNII	6K8MFD7K03
CompTox Dashboard (EPA)	DTXSID90109995
- InChI: InChI=1S/C10H16O2/c1-8(2)5-4-6-9(3)7-10(11)12/h5,7H,4,6H2,1-3H3,(H,11,12)/b9-7+ Key: ZHYZQXUYZJNEHD-VQHVLOKHSA-N
- SMILES: CC(=CCC/C(=C/C(=O)O)/C)C

Properties
Chemical formula	C_{10}H_{16}O_{2}
Molar mass	168.236 g·mol^{−1}

Related compounds
Related isomers	Geranic acid
- Except where otherwise noted, data are given for materials in their standard state (at 25 °C [77 °F], 100 kPa). Infobox references

Nerolic acid, also known as (Z)-3,7-dimethyl-2,6-octadienoic acid, is an organically-derived chemical.

== In nature ==
Nerolic acid is found in the Nasonov scent gland of honey-bees along with geraniol, geranic acid, citral, farnesol, and nerol. Of these, nerolic acid, geraniol, and farnesol are present in the highest proportions.

It is one of the five compounds that are part of the essential oils of Myrcia Ovata.

It is a compound also found in great quantity in Myrcia lundiana and it possess antifungal properties against pathogens such as Fusarium solani, and Lasiodiplodia theobromae. Both Myrcia Ovata and Myrcia lundiana are part of the Myrtaceae family plant, both containing a certain percentage of Nerolic acid compound.

In addition to this, Nerolic acid is also a principal chemical compound of essential oils of lemongrass, and is also believed to possess antifungal properties.
