= Trans-4,5-Epoxy-(E)-2-decenal =

trans-4,5-Epoxy-(E)-2-decenal

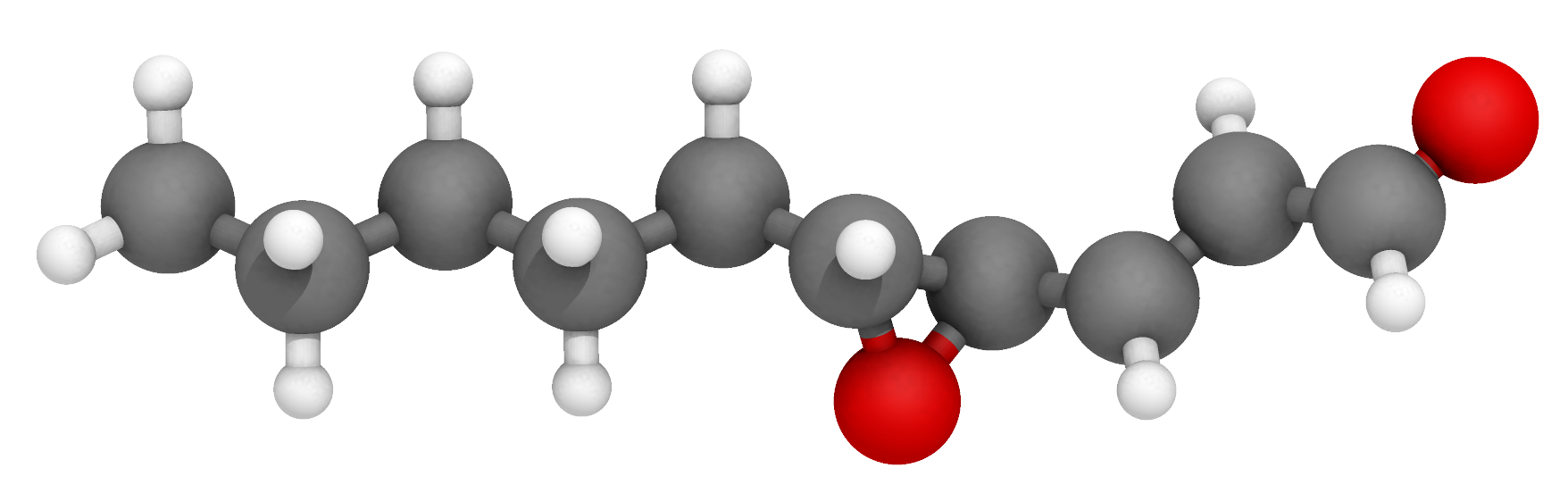

Names
- Other names 3-[(2R,3R)-3-Pentyloxiranyl]-2E-propenal; Epoxy-2-decenal

Identifiers
CAS Number	134454-31-2
3D model (JSmol)	Interactive image
ChemSpider	4509321
PubChem CID	135338390
UNII	B9K240ZU36
CompTox Dashboard (EPA)	DTXSID50940361 DTXSID50928629, DTXSID50940361
- InChI: InChI=1S/C10H16O2/c1-2-3-4-6-9-10(12-9)7-5-8-11/h5,7-10H,2-4,6H2,1H3/b7-5+/t9-,10+/m0/s1 Key: HIOMEXREAUSUBP-FNORWQNLSA-N
- SMILES: CCCCCC1OC1\C=C\C=O

Properties
Chemical formula	C_{10}H_{16}O_{2}
Molar mass	168.236 g·mol^{−1}

Hazards
- GHS labelling
Pictograms	(GHS02: Flammable) (GHS07: Exclamation mark)
Signal word	Danger
Hazard statements	H225, H319, H336 EUH066
Precautionary statements	P210, P261, P264, P280, P303+P361+P353, P304+P340, P305+P351+P338, P312, P337+P313
- Except where otherwise noted, data are given for materials in their standard state (at 25 °C [77 °F], 100 kPa). Infobox references

trans-4,5-Epoxy-(E)-2-decenal (E2D) is an oxygenated α,β-unsaturated aldehyde found in mammalian blood that gives blood its characteristic metallic odor. It is used by predators to locate blood or prey. trans-4,5-Epoxy-(E)-2-decenal is almost certainly found in all mammals. Humans can smell it at a concentration of 1.5 pg/L in air, at 15 ng/L in water and 1.3μg/L in oil. It was permitted as a food flavouring in the EU until it was prohibited on 11 July 2017 on the grounds of possible genotoxicity, as observed from rat livers.

It can be formed during baking fats that contain linoleic acid. 13-Hydroperoxy-9,11-octadecadienoic acid and 9-hydroperoxy-10,12-octadecadienoic acid are intermediates in the process. The aldehyde also forms in cooked beef when it sits in the refrigerator for too long contributing to a stale smell. It is also an important part of the smell of raw and cooked mutton.

Humans are more sensitive to the smell of trans-4,5-epoxy-(E)-2-decenal than mice. They are also more than one order of magnitude more sensitive to the (−)- enantiomer (S,S).
