= Massoia lactone =

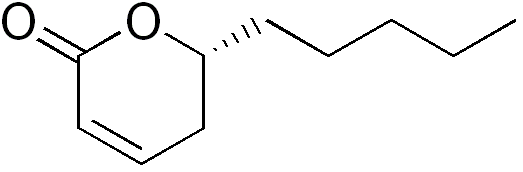

Names
- IUPAC name (R)-5,6-Dihydro-6-pentyl-2H-pyran-2-one
- Other names (R)-5-hydroxy-2-decenoic acid lactone Cocolactone; 5-Pentylpent-2-en-5-olide; C-10 massoia lactone

Identifiers
CAS Number	(R)-: 51154-96-2
3D model (JSmol)	Interactive image; (R)-: Interactive image
ChEBI	CHEBI:195785
ChEMBL	ChEMBL1991946; (R)-: ChEMBL3126829
ChemSpider	36500; (R)-: 557980
ECHA InfoCard	100.119.448
EC Number	259-359-9; (R)-: 610-624-0
PubChem CID	39914; (R)-: 642793
UNII	(R)-: 847O2V0IOA
CompTox Dashboard (EPA)	DTXSID80866186 DTXSID30885943, DTXSID80866186
- InChI: (R)-: InChI=1S/C10H16O2/c1-2-3-4-6-9-7-5-8-10(11)12-9/h5,8-9H,2-4,6-7H2,1H3/t9-/m1/s1 Key: NEDIAPMWNCQWNW-SECBINFHSA-N
- SMILES: CCCCCC1CC=CC(=O)O1; (R)-: CCCCC[C@@H]1CC=CC(=O)O1

Properties
Chemical formula	C_{10}H_{16}O_{2}
Molar mass	168.24 g/mol
Density	0.982 g/cm^{3}
Melting point	−95.2 °C (−139.4 °F; 178.0 K)
Boiling point	286–287 °C (547–549 °F; 559–560 K)
- Except where otherwise noted, data are given for materials in their standard state (at 25 °C [77 °F], 100 kPa). verify (what is ?) Infobox references

Massoia lactone is an alkyl lactone derived from the bark of the Massoia tree (Cryptocaria massoia) which is found in Papua, Indonesia though the compound can also be found as a component of cane sugar molasses, cured tobacco, and the essential oil of Sweet Osmanthus (Osmanthus fragrans). Chemically, massoia lactone can be obtained as a minor product in transfer hydrogenation of 6-amyl-α-pyrone.

Known in the late 18th and early 19th centuries as massoy bark, massoia essential oil was once widely used as a natural coconut flavouring. Natural massoia lactone has been largely superseded by a synthetic alternative because the extraction process is expensive and the process of removing the bark kills the tree.

Massoia lactone has an odour that is described as sweet, coconut meat, lactonic, creamy, milky and waxy and, at a dilution of 20 ppm, a taste described as creamy, coconut, green, and slightly fruity.
