= Nasonov's gland =

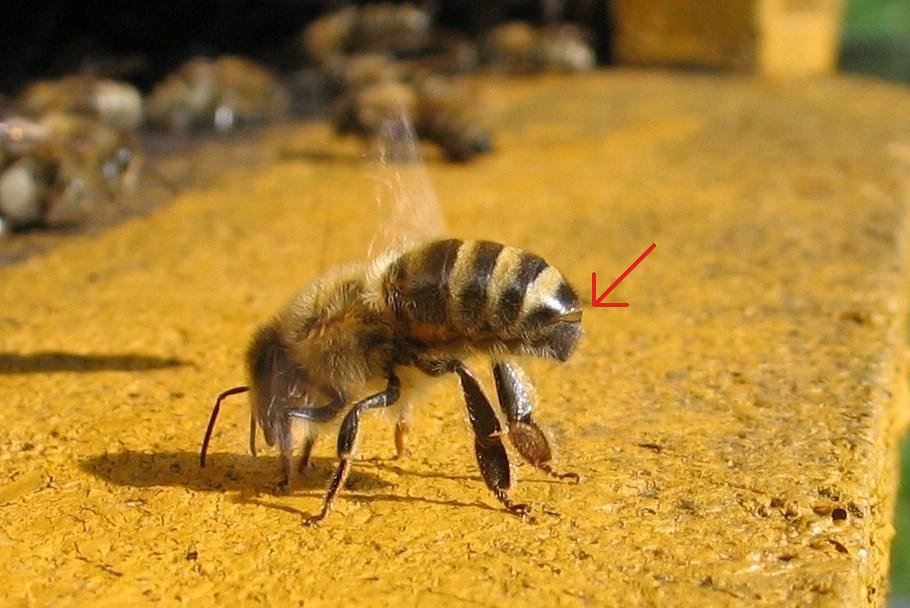
A bee at the entrance to its hive adopts the typical stance for dispersing pheromone. The thin white stripe (red arrow) near the tip of the bee's abdomen is Nasonov's gland.

Nasonov's gland produces a pheromone used in recruitment in worker honeybees. The pheromone can serve the purposes of attracting workers to a settled swarm and draw bees who have lost their way back to the hive. It is used to recruit workers to food that lacks a characteristic scent and lead bees to water sources. The gland is located on the dorsal side of the abdomen. Its opening is located at the base of the last tergite at the tip of the abdomen.

The gland was first described in 1882 by the Russian zoologist Nikolai Viktorovich Nasonov (February 14, 1855 – February 11, 1939). Nasonov thought that the gland performed perspiration; it was Frederick William Lambert Sladen (May 30, 1876 - 1921) of England who in 1901 first proposed that the gland produced a pheromone.

== See also ==
- Nasonov pheromone
