= Geranic acid =

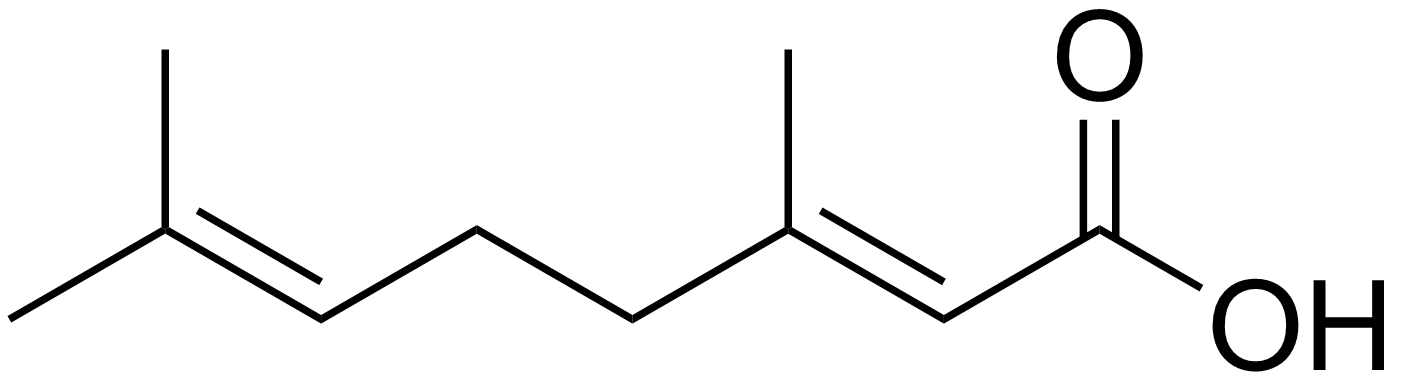

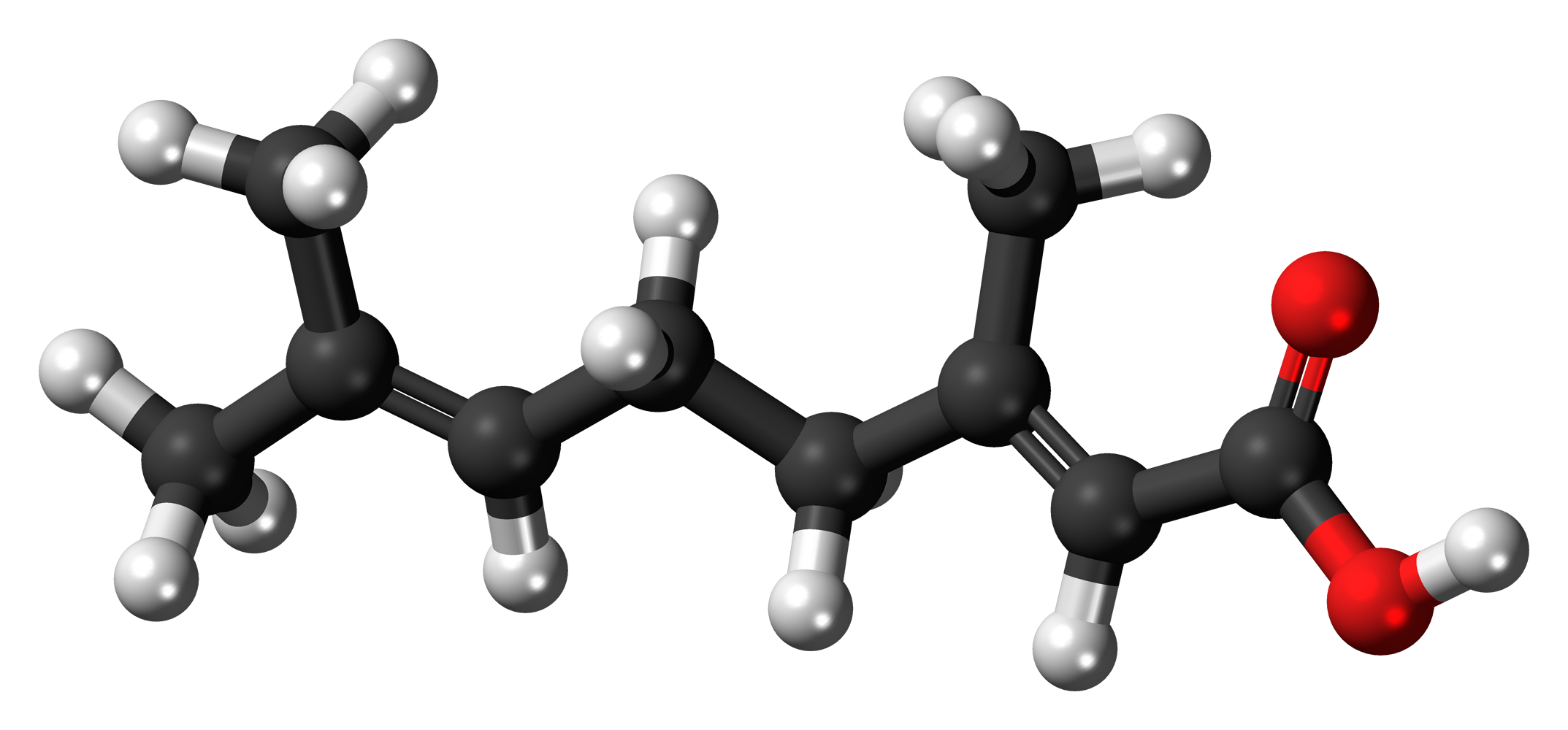

Names
- Preferred IUPAC name (2E)-3,7-Dimethylocta-2,6-dienoic acid
- Other names Geranic acid

Identifiers
CAS Number	4698-08-2
3D model (JSmol)	Interactive image
ChEBI	CHEBI:67264
ChEMBL	ChEMBL170190
ChemSpider	4439624
PubChem CID	5275520
UNII	10797G3M5Y
CompTox Dashboard (EPA)	DTXSID10109997
- InChI: InChI=1S/C10H16O2/c1-8(2)5-4-6-9(3)7-10(11)12/h5,7H,4,6H2,1-3H3,(H,11,12)/b9-7+ Key: ZHYZQXUYZJNEHD-VQHVLOKHSA-N
- SMILES: O=C(O)/C=C(/CC\C=C(/C)C)C

Properties
Chemical formula	C_{10}H_{16}O_{2}
Molar mass	168.236 g·mol^{−1}
Appearance	Oily liquid
Density	0.97 g/cm^{3}
Boiling point	249 to 251 °C (480 to 484 °F; 522 to 524 K)

Hazards
- GHS labelling
Pictograms	(GHS07: Exclamation mark)
Signal word	Warning
NFPA 704 (fire diamond)	2 1 0
Flash point	133 °C (271 °F; 406 K)
- Lethal dose or concentration (LD, LC)
LD_{50} (median dose)	3700 mg/kg (oral, rat)
Safety data sheet (SDS)	Fisher Scientific

Related compounds
Related acids	Nerolic acid, Octanoic acid
Related compounds	Geraniol; Geranial
- Except where otherwise noted, data are given for materials in their standard state (at 25 °C [77 °F], 100 kPa). verify (what is ?) Infobox references

Geranic acid, or 3,7-dimethyl-2,6-octadienoic acid, is a pheromone used by some organisms. It is a double bond isomer of nerolic acid.

== Pharmacology ==
Choline geranate (also described as Choline And Geranic acid, or CAGE) has been developed as a novel biocompatible antiseptic material capable of penetrating skin and aiding the transdermal delivery of co-administered antibiotics.

The antibacterial properties of CAGE were analyzed against 24 and 72 hour old biofilms of 11 clinically isolated ESKAPE pathogens (defined as Enterococcus faecium, Staphylococcus aureus, Klebsiella pneumoniae, Acinetobacter baumanii, Pseudomonas aeruginosa, and Enterobacter sp, respectively), including multidrug resistant (MDR) isolates.

CAGE was observed to eradicate in vitro biofilms at concentrations as low as 3.56 mM (0.156% v:v) in as little as 2 hours, which represents both an improved potency and rate of biofilm eradication relative to that reported for most common standard-of-care topical antiseptics in current use. In vitro time-kill studies on 24 hour old Staphylococcus aureus biofilms indicate that CAGE exerts its antibacterial effect upon contact and a 0.1% v:v solution reduced biofilm viability by over three orders of magnitude (a 3log10 reduction) in 15 minutes.

Furthermore, disruption of the protective layer of exopolymeric substances in mature biofilms of Staphylococcus aureus by CAGE (0.1% v:v) was observed in 120 minutes. Insight into the mechanism of action of CAGE was provided with molecular modeling studies alongside in vitro antibiofilm assays. The geranate ion and geranic acid components of CAGE are predicted to act in concert to integrate into bacterial membranes, affect membrane thinning and perturb membrane homeostasis.
