= Geranyl-diphosphate diphosphate-lyase =

Geranyl-diphosphate diphosphate-lyase may refer to:

Enzymes

- (4S)-beta-phellandrene synthase (geranyl-diphosphate-cyclizing)
- Tricyclene synthase
- (E)-beta-ocimene synthase
- (+)-car-3-ene synthase
- 1,8-cineole synthase
- (-)-sabinene synthase
- (-)-endo-fenchol synthase
- Sabinene-hydrate synthase
- Pinene synthase
- Myrcene synthase
- (4S)-limonene synthase
- S-linalool synthase
- R-linalool synthase
- (+)-sabinene synthase
- (-)-alpha-terpineol synthase
- (+)-alpha-terpineol synthase
- Terpinolene synthase
- Gamma-terpinene synthase
- Alpha-terpinene synthase
- (+)-camphene synthase
- (-)-camphene synthase
- 2-methylisoborneol synthase
- (-)-alpha-pinene synthase
- (-)-beta-pinene synthase
- (+)-alpha-pinene synthase
- (+)-beta-pinene synthase
