= Terpene synthase N terminal domain =

Protein domain

Terpene_synth
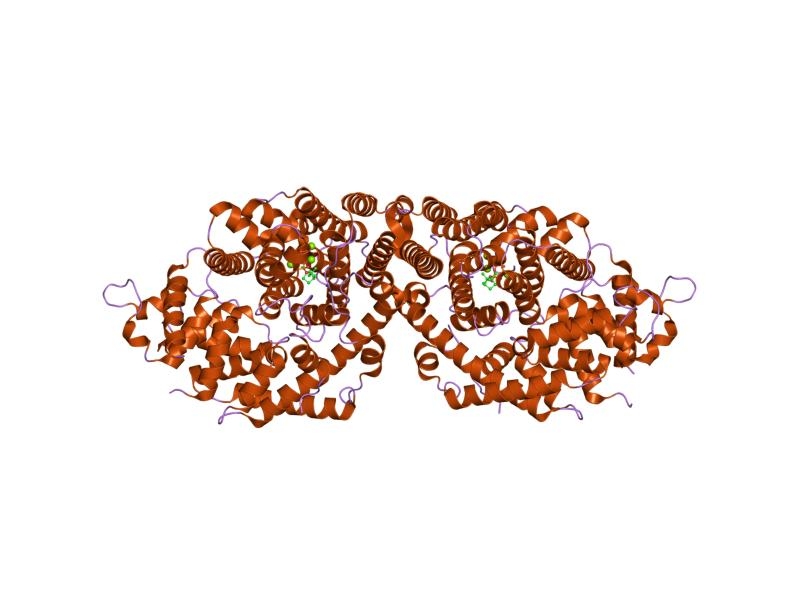
- (+)-bornyl diphosphate synthase: complex with mg and product

Identifiers
- Symbol: Terpene_synth
- Pfam: PF01397
- InterPro: IPR001906
- SCOP2: 5eau / SCOPe / SUPFAM
Available protein structures:
- Pfam: structures / ECOD
- PDB: RCSB PDB; PDBe; PDBj
- PDBsum: structure summary

In molecular biology, this protein domain belongs to the terpene synthase family (TPS). Its role is to synthesize terpenes, which are part of primary metabolism, such as sterols and carotene, and also part of the secondary metabolism. This entry will focus on the N terminal domain of the TPS protein.

== Function ==
Terpenes synthases have a role in producing important molecules in metabolism, these molecules are part of a large group called terpenoids. In particular, the N terminal domain has feature of the copalyl diphosphate synthase (CPS) active site.

== Structure ==
The N-terminal domain forms an alpha-barrel similar to that of the sesquiterpene cyclase epiaristolochene synthase.

== Conservation ==
Sequences containing this protein domain belong to the terpene synthase family. It has been suggested that this gene family be designated tps (for terpene synthase). Sequence comparisons reveal similarities between the monoterpene (C_{10}) synthases, sesquiterpene (C_{15}) synthases and the diterpene (C_{20}) synthases. It has been split into six subgroups on the basis of phylogeny, called Tpsa-Tpsf .

- Tpsa includes vetispiridiene synthase.
- Tpsb includes (-)-limonene synthase.
- Tpsc includes copalyl diphosphate synthase (kaurene synthase A).
- Tpsd includes taxadiene synthase, pinene synthase, and myrcene synthase.
- Tpse includes ent-kaurene synthase B.
- Tpsf includes S-linalool synthase. In the fungus Phaeosphaeria sp. (strain L487) the synthesis of ent-kaurene from geranylgeranyl diphosphate is promoted by a single bifunctional protein.

== See also ==
Terpene synthase C terminal domain
