= CS =

CS, C-S, C.S., Cs, cs, or cs. may refer to:

== Job titles ==
- Chief Secretary (Hong Kong)
- Chief superintendent, a rank in the British and several other police forces
- Company secretary, a senior position in a private sector company or public sector organisation
- Culinary Specialist, a US Navy occupational rating

== Language ==
- Czech language (ISO 639-1 language code)
- Hungarian cs, a digraph in the Hungarian alphabet

== Organizations ==
- CentraleSupélec, a grande école in the graduate engineering school of Paris-Saclay University, France
- Christian Social Party (Austria), a major conservative political party in the Cisleithania, part of Austria-Hungary, and in the First Republic of Austria
- Citizens (Spanish political party), a post-nationalist political party in Spain
- Congregation of the Missionaries of St. Charles, a Catholic religious congregation, also called Scalabrinians
- Confederate States of America, an unrecognized confederation of secessionist North American slave states existing from 1861 to 1865

=== Companies ===
- Colorado & Southern Railway, a railroad company in the western United States
- Connecting Stockholm, future train operator in Sweden
- Copenhagen Suborbitals, a Danish non-profit rocket group working on the HEAT1X-TYCHO BRAHE rocket
- CouchSurfing, a hospitality service
- Credit Suisse, a Swiss financial services company
- Comp-Sultants, a defunct microcomputer company
- CS Wind, a South Korea-based manufacturer of wind turbine towers

== Places ==
- Province of Cosenza, Italy
- Czechoslovakia (former ISO 3166-1 country code)
- Serbia and Montenegro (former ISO 3166-1 country code)
- Circuito Sur, national highway of Cuba

== Science and technology ==
=== Biology and medicine ===
- Caesarean section, a surgical procedure to deliver one or more babies, or, rarely, to remove a dead fetus
- Cardiogenic shock, a medical emergency where heart fails to pump properly to push blood forward
- Carotid sinus, a dilated area at the base of the internal carotid artery
- Cockayne syndrome, a rare autosomal recessive, congenital disorder
- Conditioned stimulus, in the psychological procedure of classical conditioning
- Corticosteroids, a class of hormones produced in vertebrates, and their synthetic analogues
- Cowden syndrome, a rare autosomal dominant inherited disorder
- (-)-camphene synthase, an enzyme
- CS (gene), which encodes the enzyme citrate synthase

=== Chemistry ===
- Caesium or Cesium, symbol Cs, a chemical symbol
- Carbon monosulfide, chemical formula CS

=== Computing ===
- Computer science, the scientific and practical approach to computation and its applications
- CS register, or code segment register, in X86 computer architecture
- Cable select, an ATA device setting for automatic master/slave configuration
- Checkstyle, a Java static code analysis tool
- Chip select, a control line in digital electronics
- ChanServ, an IRC network service
- Adobe Creative Suite, a design and development software suite by Adobe Systems
- C Sharp (programming language) (C#), a general-purpose, multi-paradigm programming language

=== Mathematics ===
- cs (elliptic function), one of Jacobi's elliptic functions

=== Other uses in science and technology ===
- Carbon steel
- Cirrostratus cloud
- Citizen science
- Compressed sensing, a signal processing technique for reconstructing a signal using underdetermined linear systems
- Control segment, part of the structure of the Global Positioning System
- Counter-scanning, a scanning method that allows correcting raster distortions
- cS, another form for cSt, for centistokes, a unit of viscosity

== Other uses ==
- Cable Ship, in civilian ship names
- Calgary Stampede, a rodeo
- Caught stealing, a statistic in baseball
- Chhatrapati Shivaji, c. 1627/1630 – 1680), Indian warrior king and member of the Bhonsle Maratha clan
- Christian Science, a religion
- Cities: Skylines, 2015 city-building simulation video game
- Controlled substance, generally a drug or chemical whose manufacture, possession, or use is regulated by a government
- Coke Studio (disambiguation), several musical television shows
- Counter-Strike, a series of video game first released as a 1999 modification for Half-Life
- CS gas, a riot control agent
- Cum Suis (Latin: "and associates"); see List of Latin phrases
- Customer service, the provision of service to customers before, during and after a purchase and sale
- Bombardier-Airbus C-Series, small jetliner
- Ferrari 360 Challenge Stradale
- A US Navy hull classification symbol: Scout cruiser (CS)
- Post-nominal letters for the Missionaries of St. Charles Borromeo (Scalabrinians), a Catholic religious congregation
- Portugal (aircraft registration prefix CS)

== See also ==
- C's (disambiguation)
- C/s (disambiguation)
