= 1,8-Cineole,NADPH:oxygen oxidoreductase =

1,8-Cineole,NADPH:oxygen oxidoreductase may refer to the following enzymes:

- 1,8-Cineole 2-endo-monooxygenase
- 1,8-Cineole 2-exo-monooxygenase
