= Linalool =

Chemical compound with a floral aroma

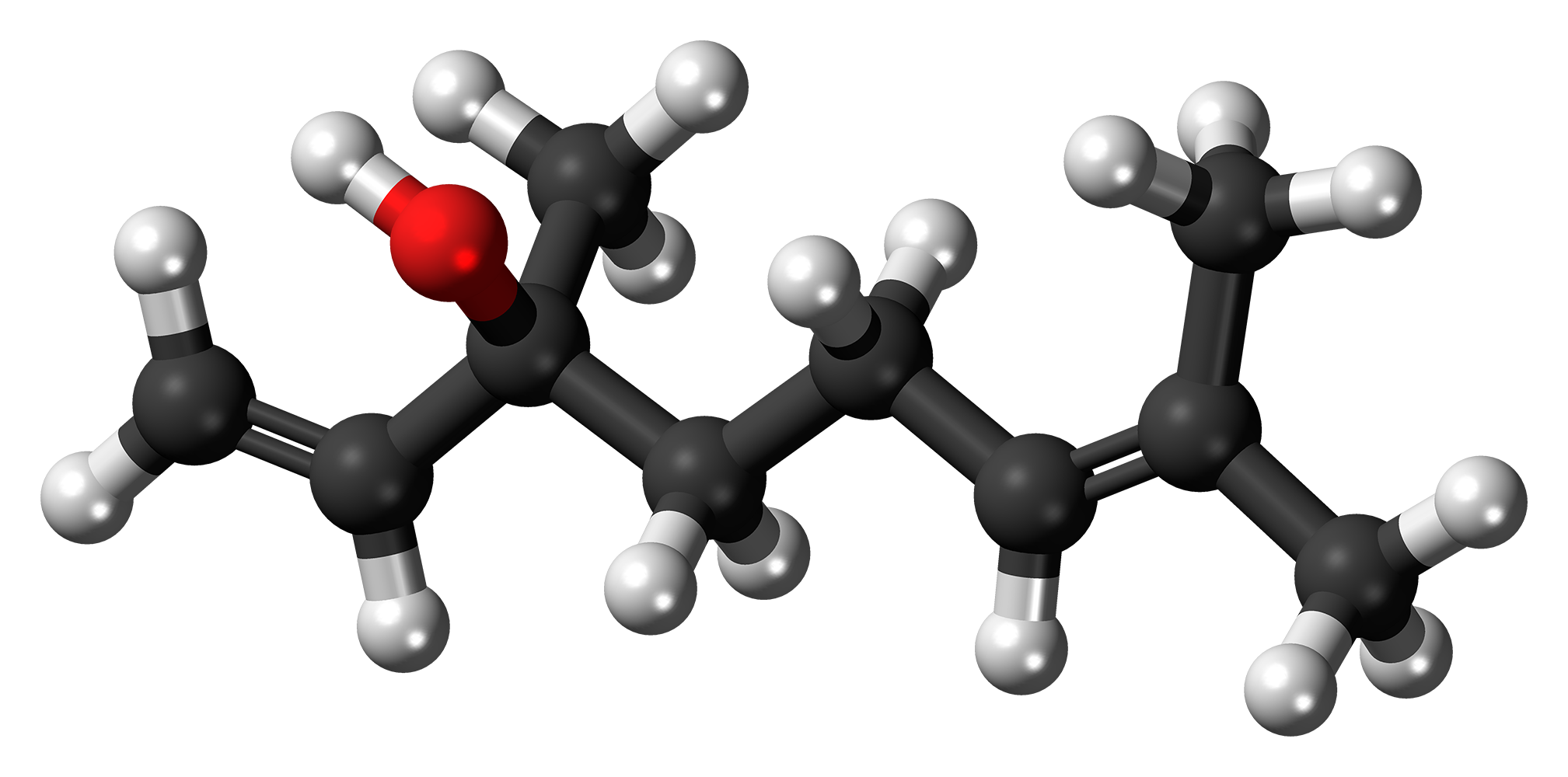

Names
- Preferred IUPAC name 3,7-Dimethylocta-1,6-dien-3-ol
- Other names 3,7-Dimethyl-1,6-octadien-3-ol, β-linalool, linalyl alcohol, linaloyl oxide, allo-ocimenol, coriandrol, Licareol

Identifiers
- Compounds; (±)-linalool; (R): (−)-linalool; (S): (+)-linalool
CAS Number	78-70-6; (R): 126-91-0; (S): 126-90-9
3D model (JSmol)	Interactive image
ChEBI	CHEBI:17580; (R): CHEBI:28; (S): CHEBI:98
ChEMBL	ChEMBL25306; (S): ChEMBL235672
ChemSpider	13849981
ECHA InfoCard	100.001.032
IUPHAR/BPS	2469
KEGG	(R): C11388; (S): C11389
PubChem CID	6549; (R): 443158; (S): 67179
UNII	D81QY6I88E; (R): 3U21E3V8I2; (S): F4VNO44C09
CompTox Dashboard (EPA)	DTXSID7025502
- InChI: InChI=1S/C10H18O/c1-5-10(4,11)8-6-7-9(2)3/h5,7,11H,1,6,8H2,2-4H3 Key: CDOSHBSSFJOMGT-UHFFFAOYSA-N; InChI=1/C10H18O/c1-5-10(4,11)8-6-7-9(2)3/h5,7,11H,1,6,8H2,2-4H3 Key: CDOSHBSSFJOMGT-UHFFFAOYAV
- SMILES: CC(O)(C=C)CCC=C(C)C

Properties
Chemical formula	C_{10}H_{18}O
Molar mass	154.253 g·mol^{−1}
Appearance	Colorless oil
Density	0.858 to 0.868 g/cm^{3}
Melting point	< −20 °C (−4 °F; 253 K)
Boiling point	198 to 199 °C (388 to 390 °F; 471 to 472 K)
Solubility in water	1.589 g/l

Hazards
NFPA 704 (fire diamond)	1 2 0
Flash point	55 °C (131 °F; 328 K)
- Except where otherwise noted, data are given for materials in their standard state (at 25 °C [77 °F], 100 kPa). verify (what is ?) Infobox references

Linalool (/ləˈnæloʊ.ɒl, ˈlɪnəluːl/), also called linalol (/ˈlɪnəlɒl/), is either of two enantiomers of a naturally occurring terpene alcohol found in many flowers and spice plants. Together with geraniol, nerol, and citronellol, linalool is one of the rose alcohols. Linalool has multiple commercial applications, the majority of which are based on its pleasant scent (floral, with a touch of spiciness).

A colorless oil, linalool is classified as an acyclic monoterpenoid. In plants, it is a metabolite, a volatile oil component, an antimicrobial agent, and an aroma compound. Linalool has uses in manufacturing of soaps, fragrances, food additives as flavors, household products, and insecticides. Esters of linalool are referred to as linalyl, e.g. linalyl pyrophosphate, an isomer of geranyl pyrophosphate.

The word linalool is based on linaloe (/ləˈnæloʊ/, a type of wood) and the suffix -ol. In food manufacturing, it may be called coriandrol.

== Occurrence ==
(S)-(+)-linalool (left) and (R)-(–)-linalool (right)

Both enantiomeric forms are found in nature: (S)-linalool (dextro-linalool) is found, for example, as a major constituent of the essential oils of coriander (Coriandrum sativum L.), cymbopogon (Cymbopogon martini var. martinii), and sweet orange (Citrus sinensis) flowers. (R)-linalool (laevo-linalool) is present in lavender (Lavandula officinalis), bay laurel (Laurus nobilis), and sweet basil (Ocimum basilicum), among others.

Each enantiomer evokes distinct neural responses in humans, so each is classified as possessing distinct scents. (S)-(+)-Linalool is perceived as sweet, floral, petitgrain-like (odor threshold 7.4 ppb) and the (R)-form as more woody and lavender-like (odor threshold 0.8 ppb).

Over 200 species of plants produce linalool, notably from the families Lamiaceae (mint and other herbs), Lauraceae (laurels, cinnamon, rosewood), and Rutaceae (citrus fruits), but also birch trees and other plants, from tropical to boreal climate zones.

- Aniba rosaeodora
- Lavandula
- Cinnamomum tamala
- Cannabis sativa
- Basil
- Solidago (goldenrod)
- Artemisia vulgaris (mugwort)
- Humulus lupulus (hop)

It was first synthesized in the laboratory of Leopold Ružička in 1919.

== Production ==
Linalool is produced commercially from several terpenes and terpenoid precursors, which are often components of terpentine. 2-Pinanol, derived from pinene, gives linalool upon pyrolysis.

=== Biosynthesis ===
In higher plants linalool is formed by rearrangement of geranyl pyrophosphate (GPP). With the aid of linalool synthase (LIS), water attacks to form the chiral center. LIS appears to show a limonene synthase-type catalysis through a simplified "metal-cofactor-binding domain [where the majority] of the residues involved in substrate...binding [are] in the C-terminal part of the protein" suggesting stereoselectivity and the reasoning behind why some plants have varying levels of each enantiomer.

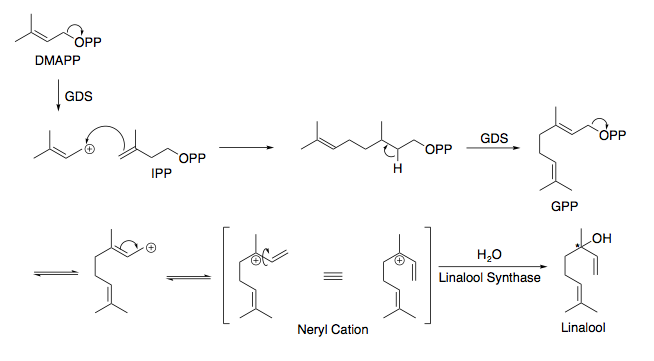
Linalool biosynthesis pathway. Abbreviations used: geranyl diphosphate synthase (GDS), pyrophosphate ester (OPP), isopentenyl pyrophosphate (IPP), dimethylallyl pyrophosphate (DMAPP), geranyl pyrophosphate (GPP). Stereogenic centers are indicated by an asterisk.

== Odor and flavor ==
Linalool has complex odor and flavor properties. Its odor is similar to floral, spicy wood, somewhat resembling French lavender plants, bergamot oil or lily of the valley. It has a light, citrus-like flavor, sweet with a spicy tropical accent. The aroma of the racemic mixture is described as citrus, floral, sweet, bois de rose, woody, green, blueberry, orange, terpenic, waxy, and rose. The aroma of the laevo enantiomer is described as fresh, floral, woody, natural, and lavender, whilst the dextro enantiomer is described as sweet, floral, petitgrain, and lavender.

Linalool is used as a scent in perfumed hygiene products and cleaning agents, including soaps, detergents, shampoos, and lotions. It exhibits antimicrobial and antifungal properties.

== Chemical derivatives ==
Linalool is hydrogenated to give dihydro- and tetrahydrolinalool, which are fragrances that are more resilient toward oxidants, as might be found in household cleaning products. Linalyl acetate, a popular scent, is produced by esterification of linalool (as well as occurring naturally). Isomerization of linalool gives geraniol and nerol.

Conversion of linalool to its dimethylcarbamate yields a compound that is known as "Pepperwood".

Linalool oxide is another example of a compound that is made from linalool starting material. There is a total of eight stereoisomeric forms of terpene linalool oxide.

Additional commercially available esters of linalool besides the acetate include: linalyl cinnamate, linalyl formate, linalyl isobutyrate, linalyl propionate & linalyl benzoate (c.f. Givaudan website) .

Elintaal (ethyl linalyl acetal) is another linalool based product, as is geranylacetone (q.v.).

== Safety ==
Linalool can be absorbed by inhalation of its aerosol and by oral intake or skin absorption, potentially causing irritation, pain and allergic reactions. Some 7% of people undergoing patch testing in Europe were found to be allergic to the oxidized form of linalool.

The US Food and Drug Administration (FDA) lists linalool in the Code of Federal Regulations under substances generally recognized as safe, synthetic flavoring substances and adjuvants.

== See also ==
- Lavender oil
