= Acacia hierochoensis =

Scientific classification
- Kingdom: Plantae
- Clade: Tracheophytes
- Clade: Angiosperms
- Clade: Eudicots
- Clade: Rosids
- Order: Fabales
- Family: Fabaceae
- Subfamily: Caesalpinioideae
- Clade: Mimosoid clade
- Genus: Acacia
- Species: A. hierochoensis

Binomial name
- Acacia hierochoensis Pedley

Species of legume

Acacia hierochoensis is a species of flowering plant in the family Fabaceae and is endemic to a small area in central Queensland, Australia. It is a shrub with linear to narrowly oblong, glabrous phyllodes, and spherical heads of twenty to thirty flowers.

== Description ==
Acacia hierochoensis is a resinous shrub, especially on its young growth and flowers, that typically grows to a height of up to 2 m (6 ft 7 in) and has glabrous branchlets. Its phyllodes are linear to narrowly oblong, narrowed towards the base, mostly 11–25 mm (0.43–0.98 in) long and 0.8–1.0 mm (0.031–0.039 in) wide, straight or slightly curved with one obscure vein. The flowers are borne in a spherical head in axils on a peduncle 6–10 mm (0.24–0.39 in) long, each head with 20 to 30 flowers. Flowering occurs in July and August, but the pods have not been seen.

== Taxonomy ==
Acacia hierochoensis was first formally described in 2019 by Leslie Pedley in the journal Austrobaileya from specimens collected near Blairgowie Station on the road to Aramac in 1999. The specific epithet (hierochoensis) is derived from "hierocho", the Latin name of the biblical city of Jericho, the name of the town Jericho in Queensland, near where this species is found.

== Distribution and habitat ==
This species of wattle is only known from a small area within 50 km (31 mi) of Jericho in central Queensland, where it has been recorded from woodland dominated by Eucalyptus cloeziana and E. crebra.

== Conservation status ==
Acacia hierochoensis is listed as of "least concern" under the Queensland Government Nature Conservation Act 1992.

== See also ==
- List of Acacia species
