= Linalool 8-monooxygenase =

linalool 8-monooxygenase

Identifiers
- EC no.: 1.14.14.84
- CAS no.: 95329-13-8

Databases
- IntEnz: IntEnz view
- BRENDA: BRENDA entry
- ExPASy: NiceZyme view
- KEGG: KEGG entry
- MetaCyc: metabolic pathway
- PRIAM: profile
- PDB structures: RCSB PDB PDBe PDBsum
- Gene Ontology: AmiGO / QuickGO
Search
- PMC: articles
- PubMed: articles
- NCBI: proteins

In enzymology, a linalool 8-monooxygenase (EC 1.14.14.84, Formerly EC 1.14.13.151) is an enzyme that catalyzes the chemical reaction

3,7-dimethylocta-1,6-dien-3-ol + AH_{2} + O_{2} $\rightleftharpoons$ (E)-3,7-dimethylocta-1,6-dien-3,8-diol + A + H_{2}O

The 3 substrates of this enzyme are 3,7-dimethylocta-1,6-dien-3-ol, an electron acceptor AH_{2}, and O_{2}, whereas its 3 products are (E)-3,7-dimethylocta-1,6-diene-3,8-diol, the reduction product A, and H_{2}O.

This enzyme belongs to the family of oxidoreductases, specifically those acting on paired donors, with O2 as oxidant and incorporation or reduction of oxygen. The oxygen incorporated need not be derive from O miscellaneous. The systematic name of this enzyme class is 3,7-dimethylocta-1,6-dien-3-ol,hydrogen-donor:oxygen oxidoreductase (8-hydroxylating). It employs one cofactor, heme.
