= Limonene synthase =

Limonene synthase may refer to one of two enzymes:

- (R)-limonene synthase
- (4S)-limonene synthase
