= Linalool synthase =

Linalool synthase may refer to one of two enzymes:

- R-linalool synthase
- S-linalool synthase
