= All-trans-nonaprenyl diphosphate synthase =

All-trans-nonaprenyl diphosphate synthase (previously known as trans-octaprenyltranstransferase) may refer to:

- All-trans-nonaprenyl diphosphate synthase (geranylgeranyl-diphosphate specific), enzyme
- All-trans-nonaprenyl-diphosphate synthase (geranyl-diphosphate specific), enzyme
