= 1,8-cineole synthase =

Class of enzymes

Identifiers
- EC no.: 4.2.3.108
- CAS no.: 110637-19-9

Databases
- IntEnz: IntEnz view
- BRENDA: BRENDA entry
- ExPASy: NiceZyme view
- KEGG: KEGG entry
- MetaCyc: metabolic pathway
- PRIAM: profile
- PDB structures: RCSB PDB PDBe PDBsum
Search
- PMC: articles
- PubMed: articles
- NCBI: proteins

1,8-Cineole synthase (EC 4.2.3.108, 1,8-cineole cyclase, geranyl pyrophoshate:1,8-cineole cyclase, 1,8-cineole synthetase) is an enzyme with systematic name geranyl-diphosphate diphosphate-lyase (cyclizing, 1,8-cineole-forming). This enzyme catalyses the following chemical reaction

geranyl diphosphate + H_{2}O $\rightleftharpoons$ 1,8-cineole + diphosphate

This enzyme requires Mn^{2+} or Zn^{2+}. Geranyl diphosphate first isomerizes to (S)-linalyl diphosphate which ionises to the alpha-terpinyl cation which reacts with water to form the product.
