= Apocrypta bakeri =

Scientific classification
- Domain: Eukaryota
- Kingdom: Animalia
- Phylum: Arthropoda
- Class: Insecta
- Order: Hymenoptera
- Family: Pteromalidae
- Genus: Apocrypta
- Species: A. bakeri

Binomial name
- Apocrypta bakeri (Joseph, 1952)

Synonyms
- Lipothymus bakeri Joseph, 1952; Goniogaster bakeri (Joseph, 1952)

Species of wasp

Apocrypta bakeri is a species of fig wasps in the family Pteromalidae. It has Ficus hispida as its host, where it parasitizes the other fig wasp Ceratosolen solmsi.
