= Geranyl diphosphate 2-C-methyltransferase =

Class of enzymes

Identifiers
- EC no.: 2.1.1.255

Databases
- IntEnz: IntEnz view
- BRENDA: BRENDA entry
- ExPASy: NiceZyme view
- KEGG: KEGG entry
- MetaCyc: metabolic pathway
- PRIAM: profile
- PDB structures: RCSB PDB PDBe PDBsum
Search
- PMC: articles
- PubMed: articles
- NCBI: proteins

Geranyl diphosphate 2-C-methyltransferase (EC 2.1.1.255, SCO7701, GPP methyltransferase, GPPMT, 2-methyl-GPP synthase, MGPPS, geranyl pyrophosphate methyltransferase) is an enzyme with systematic name S-adenosyl-L-methionine:geranyl-diphosphate 2-C-methyltransferase. This enzyme catalyses the following chemical reaction

S-adenosyl-L-methionine + geranyl diphosphate $\rightleftharpoons$ S-adenosyl-L-homocysteine + (E)-2-methylgeranyl diphosphate

This enzyme takes part in synthesis of 2-methylisoborneol.
