= MIB =

MIB may refer to:

== Computing ==
- Mebibyte (MiB), a multiple of the unit byte for digital information
- Management information base, a computing information repository used by the Simple Network Management Protocol
- Modular infotainment platform vehicle infotainment architecture
- Man-in-the-browser attack

== Fiction ==
- Men in Black (1934 film), a Three Stooges short
- Men in Black (franchise)
  - The Men in Black (comics)
  - Men in Black (1997 film), based on the comic
  - Men in Black II, its 2002 sequel
  - Men in Black 3, its 2012 trilogy closer
  - Men in Black: International, its 2019 spin-off
  - Men in Black: The Series, based on the original film
- The Man in Black (Lost), the main antagonist in the TV series Lost
- The Man in Black (Westworld), the main antagonist in the TV series Westworld
- The Medical Inspection Bureau, a fictional organization from the manga series Battle Angel Alita

== Places ==
- Minot Air Force Base, IATA code MIB
- International Museum of the Baroque, Puebla, México

== People ==
- Michael Ian Black (born 1971), American comedian, actor and writer
- Mistress Isabelle Brooks (born 1998), American drag performer

== Organizations ==
- Men in Black (disambiguation), in conspiracy theory, a group of mysterious agents
- Manchester Institute of Biotechnology, England
- Meiringen-Innertkirchen-Bahn, a Swiss railway company
- MIB Group (formerly Medical Information Bureau), an insurance industry fraud prevention data exchange
- MIB School of Management Trieste, an international business school in Trieste, Italy
- Motor Insurers' Bureau, a British company which deals with uninsured compensation claims
- M.I.B (band), a South Korean music group
- Mishap Investigation Board (MIB), an ad hoc NASA board to investigate incidents and mishaps, e.g. the Genesis MIB
- Military Intelligence Bureau (MIB or TMIB), a Taiwanese intelligence agency

== Business ==
- MCB Islamic Bank, Pakistani bank
- FTSE MIB (Milano Italia Borsa), the main stock market index of the Borsa Italiana
- Master of International Business, a postgraduate master's degree
- Master of Internet Business, a postgraduate master's degree (e.g. ISDI University)

== Science ==
- Mibolerone, a potent synthetic anabolic-androgenic steroid
- Motion induced blindness, a visual illusion
- 2-methylisoborneol, a musty-smelling odorant sometimes found in drinking water and cork taint
- 2-methylisoborneol synthase, an enzyme

== Other ==
- Melayu Islam Beraja, the adopted national philosophy of Brunei
- Message in a bottle, a form of communication in which a message is sealed in a container and released
- Mint In Box, a collector's abbreviation for an item in mint condition
- Slang for a marble

== See also ==
- Man in Black (disambiguation)
- Men in Black (disambiguation)
- MIB1
