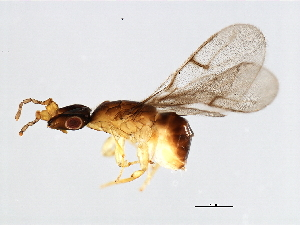

Scientific classification
- Kingdom: Animalia
- Phylum: Arthropoda
- Class: Insecta
- Order: Hymenoptera
- Family: Agaonidae
- Genus: Ceratosolen
- Species: C. solmsi

Binomial name
- Ceratosolen solmsi (Mayr, 1885)

Synonyms
- Blastophaga solmsi Mayr, 1885; Ceratosolen marchali Mayr, 1906; Ceratosolen solmsi solmsi (Mayr, 1885); Ceratosolen solmsi marchali Mayr, 1906; Ceratosolen berlandi Grandi, 1928

= Ceratosolen solmsi =

Species of wasp

Ceratosolen solmsi is a species of fig wasps in the family Agaonidae. They are obligate pollinators of the opposite leaf fig, Ficus hispidia a functionally dioecious tree. Wasp larvae develop and hatch into mature wasps entirely within the body of the fig. Female wasps that develop in the center rather than the periphery of the fig have more mating opportunities, produce more offspring, and produce more female relative to male offspring. These wasps are short-lived, typically surviving for less than 2 days after hatching, and are capable of dispersing, laying eggs, and breeding within this short time frame. They breed in figs, primarily locating them through olfaction.

== Habitat ==
C. solmsi has been identified in several countries, including India, Sri Lanka, China, Australia, and the Malayan Peninsula. The species was originally identified by Mayr in Java. Fig wasps, along with their fig symbionts, live primarily in complex rainforest environments

== Morphology ==
Males and females of the C. solmsi have extreme sexual dimorphism. The dorsal side of females is a brownish-black colour, while their ventral side is a pale brownish-yellow, and they are 1.4 to 1.5 mm in length. Their wings are translucent and have a layer of fine, short hairs. Males of this species are apterous, vermiform, and live for only a short period of time. They are 1.1 to 1.3 mm in length and are a pale brownish-yellow colour. Their abdomen remains tucked under the rest of their body. They possess mandibles, which they use to chew holes in the galls of their host figs and in the syconium wall to allow females to escape.

== Olfaction ==
To find their respective figs, C. solmsi must disperse over long distances in their very short life span. They must also be able to locate their hosts in the dense rainforest environments in which they grow. To facilitate this process, females rely primarily on olfactory signals. Sensilla, typically distributed along the antennae, serve as olfactory receptors in insects. These wasps possess 13 types of sensilla. 5 are suggested to be chemoreceptors, while others may be involved in mechano-, thermo-, and/or hygro-reception, or pressure detection, which play a complementary role in locating and discriminating between host figs.

Figs on F. hispidia undergo five stages of development. It has been found that figs are only receptive to pollinators when in their female stage. Odours emitted by these figs change between floral stages, and it was found that C. solmsi were most attracted to these figs when in their female floral stage, at which the fig is most receptive to the pollen distributed by female pollinators. (R)-(+)-linalool and (–)-ß-pinene were found to enhance the attractiveness of the (S)-(–)-linalool compound to pollinator wasps.

== Vision ==
Most Hymenopterans are trichromatic, meaning they possess receptors for UV, blue, and green light. While they can be found in a variety of habitats, they have little variation in spectral sensitivity. The life cycles of C. solmsi are synchronized with the development of their hosts, F. hispidia., however, and it was found that the expression of opsin genes in males of C. solmsi has a different response to light than those in females of the species. Opsin genes code for light-sensitive proteins, which are required for vision and non-visual light detection. They also form visual pigments used for colour and low-light vision. Females also develop compound eyes, while males' eyes are degenerate, likely because they remain inside the syconium for the entirety of their lifespan. Females are highly phototaxic and typically emerge from the syconium in the morning in response to light.

== Reproduction ==
Females (also called foundresses) are responsible for the pollination of their host figs. Female pollinators locate and enter the receptive syconium of a male fig tree through a small opening called the ostiole. Once inside, she lays her eggs individually inside the modified ovaries of the fig by inserting her ovipositor through the styles while simultaneously distributing pollen from her natal tree. After approximately 30 days, the fig's modified ovaries grow into galls, and the wasps reach maturity. Males emerge first from their galls and immediately search for females. Males are responsible for identifying galls containing females and mating with them, which they do by biting holes in a female-containing gall and inserting their aedeagus through the chewed holes. Each male often mates with 4 to 5 females consecutively. The males then enlarge the mating holes, with some chewing holes in the syconium wall, allowing the females to emerge and disperse to other receptive F. hispidia trees. Males are not modified for fighting or rapid locomotion, but they have evolved a morphology to counter sperm competition. A lack of aggression is characteristic of the family Agaonidae.

=== Sex determination ===
Most phenotypic differences are mediated by the sex-based expression of genes, with differentiation possibly involving a significant proportion of the genome. In insects, miRNAs regulate developmental processes, including sexual differentiation and metamorphosis. It does this by degrading target mRNAs or by inhibiting translation. The key gene that turns on the sex-determining cascade in C. solmsi is the transformer gene. They are also an example of a non-CSD insect species, meaning that they do not use the Complementary Sex Determination genetic system for determining sex.

=== Local mate competition ===
Offspring sex ratio is female-biased when there is only one foundress, and an increased sex ratio results when there is increased foundress density. The offspring sex ratio was also found to decrease with clutch size, with most male offspring being produced at the start of oviposition, followed by mostly females. When egg-laying sites are not limited, it is suggested that sex ratios are adjusted to other foundresses. When their oviposition sites are limited, however, adjusting clutch size may be used to adjust the sex ratio.
