= C/s =

C/s may refer to:

- Client–server model, a computer network programming model
- Cycle per second, a now-obsolete unit of frequency
- C/S, a Philippine television network
- Chew and spit, a compensatory behaviour attributed to eating disorders

== See also ==
- CS (disambiguation)
