= (−)-beta-pinene synthase =

Enzyme

(−)-β-pinene synthase

Identifiers
- EC no.: 4.2.3.120

Databases
- IntEnz: IntEnz view
- BRENDA: BRENDA entry
- ExPASy: NiceZyme view
- KEGG: KEGG entry
- MetaCyc: metabolic pathway
- PRIAM: profile
- PDB structures: RCSB PDB PDBe PDBsum
Search
- PMC: articles
- PubMed: articles
- NCBI: proteins

(−)-β-Pinene synthase (EC 4.2.3.120, β-geraniolene synthase, (−)-(1S,5S)-pinene synthase, geranyldiphosphate diphosphate lyase (pinene forming)) is an enzyme with systematic name geranyl-diphosphate diphosphate-lyase [cyclizing, (−)-β-pinene-forming]. This enzyme catalyses the following chemical reaction

geranyl diphosphate $\rightleftharpoons$ (−)-β-pinene + diphosphate

Cyclase II of Salvia officinalis (sage) produces about equal parts (−)-α-pinene, (−)-β-pinene and (−)-camphene.
