= Men in White =

Men in White may refer to:

== Film and theatre ==
- Men in White (play), a 1933 drama written by Sidney S. Kingsley
- Men in White (1934 film), an American drama film
- Men in White (1955 film), a 1955 French drama film
- Men in White (1998 film), a comedy film by National Lampoon Inc
- Men in White (TV series), a Channel 4 television programme
- Men in White (2007 film), a Singaporean comedy film

== Other ==
- Moniker for members of the People's Action Party of Singapore for their traditional party uniform of white shirts and white pants

== See also ==
- Men in Black (disambiguation)
- The Man in White, a 2003 Japanese yakuza film
- The Woman in White (disambiguation)
