= (+)-car-3-ene synthase =

Class of enzymes

Identifiers
- EC no.: 4.2.3.107

Databases
- IntEnz: IntEnz view
- BRENDA: BRENDA entry
- ExPASy: NiceZyme view
- KEGG: KEGG entry
- MetaCyc: metabolic pathway
- PRIAM: profile
- PDB structures: RCSB PDB PDBe PDBsum
Search
- PMC: articles
- PubMed: articles
- NCBI: proteins

(+)-Car-3-ene synthase (EC 4.2.3.107, 3-carene cyclase, 3-carene synthase, 3CAR, (+)-3-carene synthase) is an enzyme with systematic name geranyl-diphosphate diphosphate-lyase [cyclizing, (+)-car-3-ene-forming]. This enzyme catalyses the following chemical reaction

geranyl diphosphate $\rightleftharpoons$ (+)-car-3-ene + diphosphate

The enzyme reacts with (3S)-linalyl diphosphate twice as rapidly as geranyl diphosphate.
