= Men in Black =

Men in black, in American popular culture and in UFO conspiracy theories or urban legends, either sci-fi like, at times supernatural, and sometimes both, are men dressed in black suits who claim to be government agents who harass or threaten UFO witnesses to keep them quiet about what they have seen.

Men in Black may also refer to:

== Arts and entertainment ==
- Men in Black (1934 film), a Three Stooges short film
- The Men in Black (comics), comic book series
  - Men in Black (franchise), based on The Men in Black comics
    - Men in Black (film series)
      - Men in Black (1997 film), based on the comic series
        - Men in Black: The Album, the soundtrack album from the 1997 film
          - "Men in Black" (song), a song by Will Smith and Coko
        - Men in Black: The Series, an animated series based on the 1997 film
      - Men in Black II, the 2002 sequel to the 1997 film
      - Men in Black 3, the third film in the series (2012)
      - Men in Black: International, the fourth film in the series (2019)
- "Men in Black", a song on Frank Black's 1996 album The Cult of Ray
- Men in Black, a 1995 novel by Scott Spencer

== Fictional characters ==
- Men in Black (The X-Files), characters from the TV show The X-Files

== See also ==
- The Gospel According to the Meninblack, sometimes shortened to The Meninblack, a 1981 concept album by The Stranglers
- Men in White (disambiguation)
- Man in Black (disambiguation)
- MIB (disambiguation)
