= Eucalyptol =

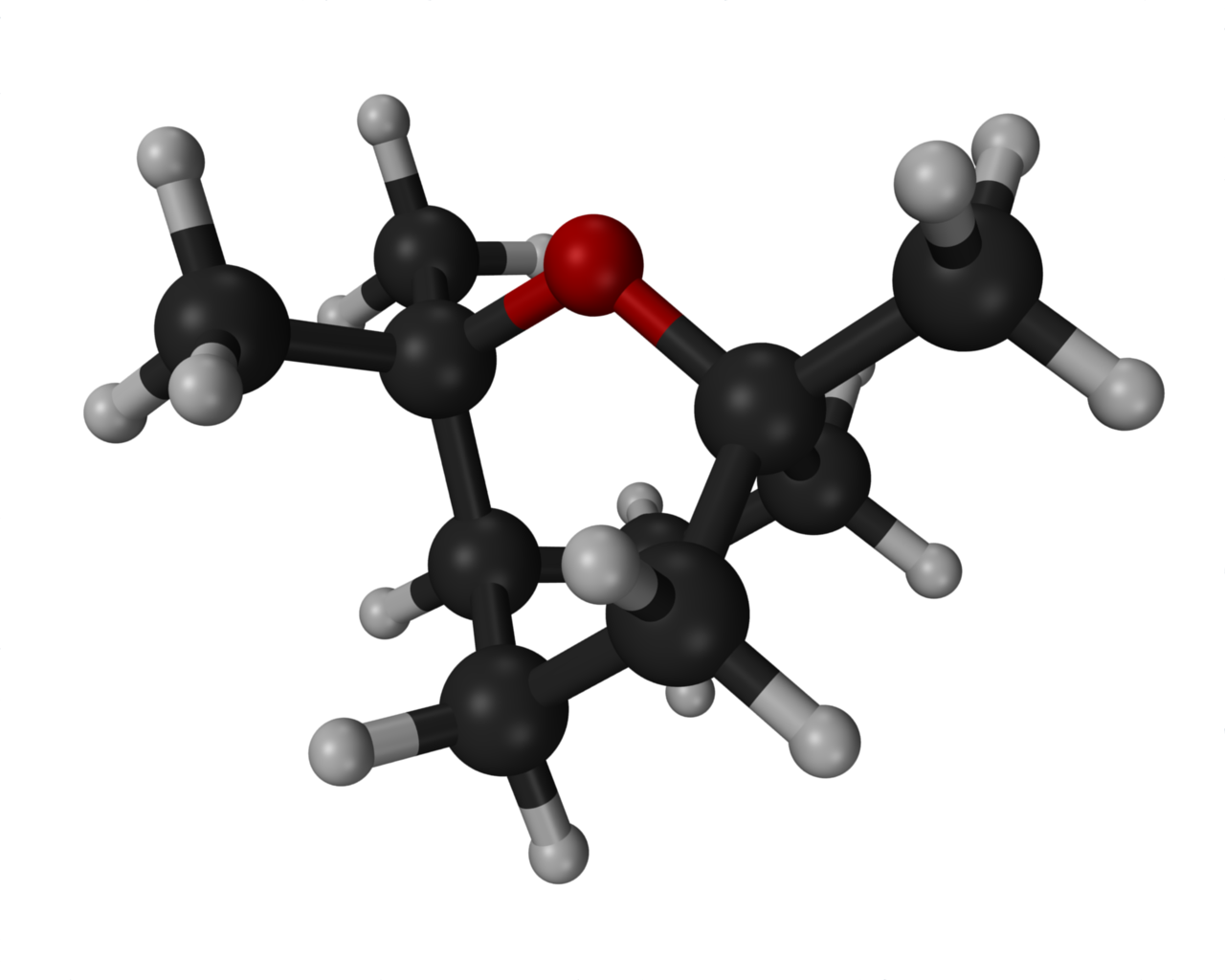

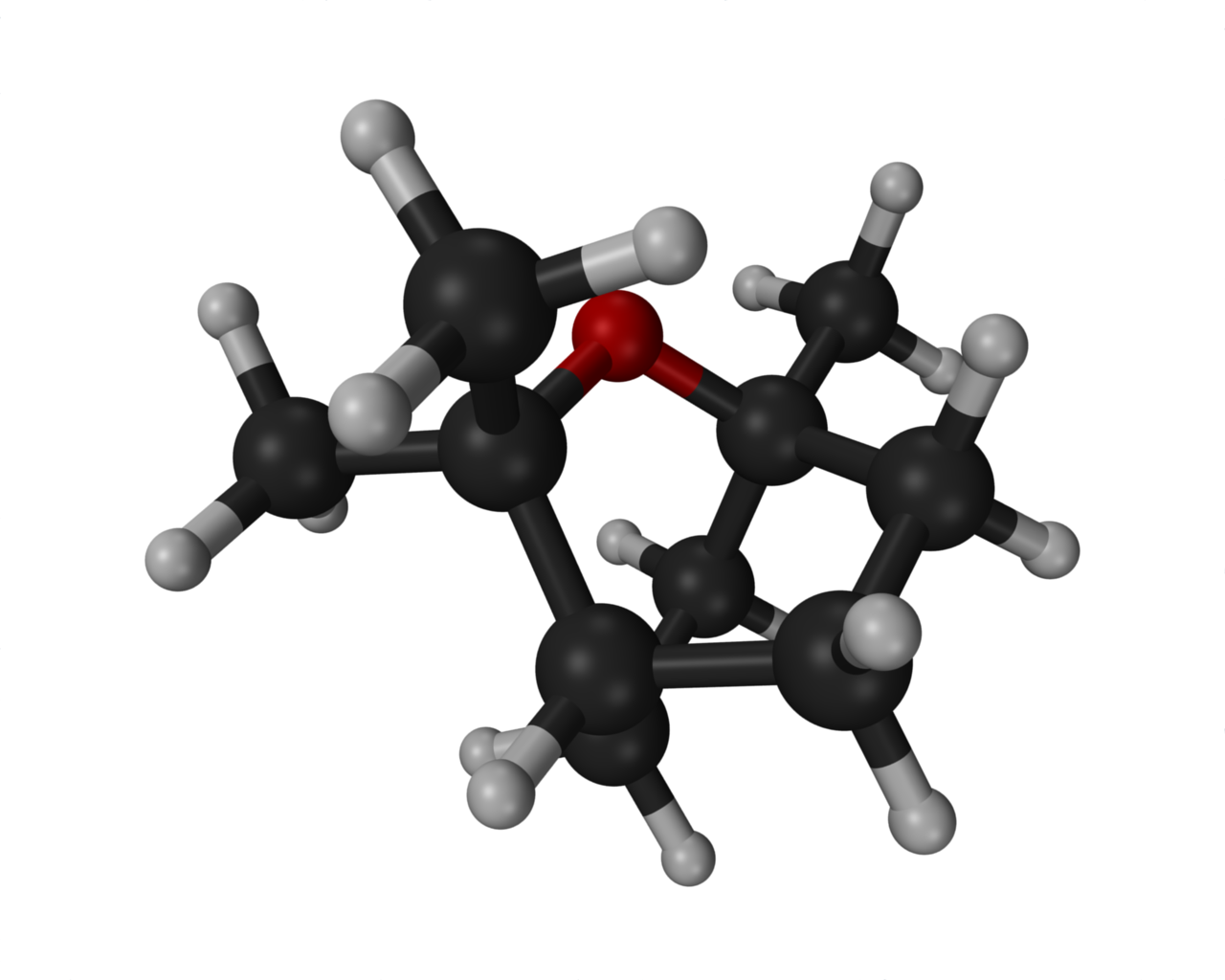

Names
- IUPAC name 1,3,3-Trimethyl-2-oxabicyclo[2.2.2]octane
- Other names 1,8-Cineole; 1,8-Epoxy-p-menthane; Cajeputol; 1,8-Epoxy-p-menthane; 1,8-Oxido-p-menthane; Eucalyptole; 1,3,3-Trimethyl-2-oxabicyclo[2.2.2]octane; Cineol; Cineole

Identifiers
| CAS Number | 470-82-6 |
| 3D model (JSmol) | Interactive image |
| Beilstein Reference | 105109 5239941 |
| ChEBI | CHEBI:27961 |
| ChEMBL | ChEMBL485259 |
| ChemSpider | 2656 |
| DrugBank | DB03852 |
| ECHA InfoCard | 100.006.757 |
| EC Number | 207-431-5 |
| Gmelin Reference | 131076 |
| IUPHAR/BPS | 2464 |
| KEGG | D04115 |
| PubChem CID | 2758 |
| UNII | RV6J6604TK |
| CompTox Dashboard (EPA) | DTXSID4020616 |
- InChI: InChI=1S/C10H18O/c1-9(2)8-4-6-10(3,11-9)7-5-8/h8H,4-7H2,1-3H3 Key: WEEGYLXZBRQIMU-UHFFFAOYSA-N; InChI=1/C10H18O/c1-9(2)8-4-6-10(3,11-9)7-5-8/h8H,4-7H2,1-3H3 Key: WEEGYLXZBRQIMU-UHFFFAOYAY
- SMILES: O2C1(CCC(CC1)C2(C)C)C

Properties
| Chemical formula | C_{10}H_{18}O |
| Molar mass | 154.253 g·mol^{−1} |
| Density | 0.9225 g/cm^{3} |
| Melting point | 2.9 °C (37.2 °F; 276.0 K) |
| Boiling point | 176–177 °C (349–351 °F; 449–450 K) |
| Magnetic susceptibility (χ) | −116.3×10^{−6} cm^{3}/mol |

Pharmacology
| ATC code | R05CA13 (WHO) |

Hazards
- GHS labelling
| Pictograms | (GHS02: Flammable) (GHS07: Exclamation mark) (GHS08: Health hazard) (GHS09: Environmental hazard) |
| Signal word | Danger |
| Hazard statements | H226, H304, H315, H317, H319, H411 |
| Precautionary statements | P210, P233, P240, P241, P242, P243, P261, P264, P272, P273, P280, P301+P310, P302+P352, P303+P361+P353, P305+P351+P338, P321, P331, P332+P313, P333+P313, P337+P313, P362, P363, P370+P378, P391, P403+P235, P405, P501 |
- Except where otherwise noted, data are given for materials in their standard state (at 25 °C [77 °F], 100 kPa). Infobox references

Eucalyptol (also called cineole) is a monoterpenoid colorless liquid, and a bicyclic ether. It has a fresh camphor-like odor and a spicy, cooling taste. It is insoluble in water, but miscible with organic solvents. Eucalyptol makes up about 70–90% of eucalyptus oil. Eucalyptol forms crystalline adducts with hydrohalic acids, o-cresol, resorcinol, and phosphoric acid. Formation of these adducts is useful for purification.

In 1870, F. S. Cloez identified and ascribed the name "eucalyptol" to the dominant portion of Eucalyptus globulus oil.

== Uses ==
Because of its pleasant, spicy aroma and taste, eucalyptol is used in flavorings, fragrances, and cosmetics. Cineole-based eucalyptus oil is used as a flavoring at low levels (0.002%) in various products, including baked goods, confectionery, meat products, and beverages. In a 1994 report released by five top cigarette companies, eucalyptol was listed as one of the 599 additives to cigarettes. Eucalyptol is a natural cooling agent. In e-liquid formulations, it is safer for humans than synthetic coolants such as WS-23. It is claimed to be added to improve the flavor.

Eucalyptol is an ingredient in commercial mouthwashes and cough suppressants.

=== Other ===
Eucalyptol exhibits insecticidal and insect repellent properties.

In contrast, eucalyptol is one of many compounds that are attractive to males of various species of orchid bees, which gather the chemical to synthesize pheromones; it is commonly used as bait to attract and collect these bees for study. One such study with Euglossa imperialis, a nonsocial orchid bee species, has shown that the presence of cineole (also eucalyptol) elevates territorial behavior and specifically attracts the male bees. It was even observed that these males would periodically leave their territories to forage for chemicals such as cineole, thought to be important for attracting and mating with females, to synthesize pheromones.

== Toxicology ==
Eucalyptol has a toxicity (LD_{50}) of 2.48 grams per kg (rat). Ingestion in significant quantities is likely to cause headache and gastric distress, such as nausea and vomiting. Because of its low viscosity, it may directly enter the lungs if swallowed, or if subsequently vomited. Once in the lungs, it is difficult to remove and can cause delirium, convulsions, severe injury or death.

Consequently, eucalyptol should never be ingested unless in highly diluted formulations. Toxicity is significantly reduced when administered topically. However it should not be used topically during pregnancy, breastfeeding, or on children under two.

== Biosynthesis ==
Eucalyptol is generated from geranyl pyrophosphate (GPP) which isomerizes to (S)-linalyl diphosphate (LPP). Ionization of the pyrophosphate, catalyzed by cineole synthase, produces eucalyptol. The process involves the intermediacy of alpha-terpinyl cation.

== Plants containing eucalyptol ==
- Aframomum corrorima
- Artemisia tridentata
- Cannabis
- Cinnamomum camphora, camphor laurel (50%)
- Eucalyptus globulus
- Eucalyptus largiflorens
- Eucalyptus salmonophloia
- Eucalyptus staigeriana
- Eucalyptus wandoo
- Hedychium coronarium, butterfly lily
- Helichrysum gymnocephalum
- Kaempferia galanga, galangal, (5.7%)
- S. officinalis subsp. lavandulifolia (syn. S. lavandulifolia), Spanish sage (13%)
- Salvia rosmarinus, rosemary
- Turnera diffusa, damiana
- Umbellularia californica, pepperwood (22.0%)
- Zingiber officinale, ginger

== See also ==
- Camphor
- Citral
- Eucalyptus oil
- Lavandula
- Menthol
- Mouthwash
