= (4S)-beta-phellandrene synthase (geranyl-diphosphate-cyclizing) =

Class of enzymes

β-phellandrene synthase (geranyl-diphosphate-cyclizing)

Identifiers
- EC no.: 4.2.3.52
- CAS no.: 137010-34-5

Databases
- IntEnz: IntEnz view
- BRENDA: BRENDA entry
- ExPASy: NiceZyme view
- KEGG: KEGG entry
- MetaCyc: metabolic pathway
- PRIAM: profile
- PDB structures: RCSB PDB PDBe PDBsum
Search
- PMC: articles
- PubMed: articles
- NCBI: proteins

β-Phellandrene synthase (EC 4.2.3.52, geranyl-diphosphate-cyclizing) (phellandrene synthase, (−)-β-phellandrene synthase, (−)-(4S)-β-phellandrene synthase) is an enzyme with systematic name geranyl-diphosphate diphosphate-lyase (cyclizing; β-phellandrene-forming). This enzyme catalyses the following chemical reaction

geranyl diphosphate $\rightleftharpoons$ β-phellandrene + diphosphate

This enzyme requires ion Mn^{2+}.
