= Terpinolene synthase =

Class of enzymes

Identifiers
- EC no.: 4.2.3.113

Databases
- IntEnz: IntEnz view
- BRENDA: BRENDA entry
- ExPASy: NiceZyme view
- KEGG: KEGG entry
- MetaCyc: metabolic pathway
- PRIAM: profile
- PDB structures: RCSB PDB PDBe PDBsum
Search
- PMC: articles
- PubMed: articles
- NCBI: proteins

Terpinolene synthase (EC 4.2.3.113, ag9, PmeTPS2, LaLIMS_RR) is an enzyme with systematic name geranyl-diphosphate diphosphate-lyase (cyclizing, terpinolene-forming). This enzyme catalyses the following chemical reaction

geranyl diphosphate $\rightleftharpoons$ terpinolene + diphosphate

This enzyme requires Mg^{2+}.
