= Gamma-terpinene synthase =

γ-terpinene synthase

Identifiers
- EC no.: 4.2.3.114

Databases
- IntEnz: IntEnz view
- BRENDA: BRENDA entry
- ExPASy: NiceZyme view
- KEGG: KEGG entry
- MetaCyc: metabolic pathway
- PRIAM: profile
- PDB structures: RCSB PDB PDBe PDBsum
Search
- PMC: articles
- PubMed: articles
- NCBI: proteins

γ-Terpinene synthase (EC 4.2.3.114, OvTPS2, ClcTS) is an enzyme with systematic name geranyl-diphosphate diphosphate-lyase (cyclizing, γ-terpinene-forming). This enzyme catalyses the following chemical reaction

geranyl diphosphate $\rightleftharpoons$ γ-terpinene + diphosphate

This enzyme is isolated from Thymus vulgaris (thyme), Citrus limon (lemon), Citrus unshiu (satsuma) and Origanum vulgare (oregano).
