= (−)-alpha-terpineol synthase =

Class of enzymes

(−)-α-terpineol synthase

Identifiers
- EC no.: 4.2.3.111

Databases
- IntEnz: IntEnz view
- BRENDA: BRENDA entry
- ExPASy: NiceZyme view
- KEGG: KEGG entry
- MetaCyc: metabolic pathway
- PRIAM: profile
- PDB structures: RCSB PDB PDBe PDBsum
Search
- PMC: articles
- PubMed: articles
- NCBI: proteins

(−)-α-Terpineol synthase (EC 4.2.3.111) is an enzyme with systematic name geranyl-diphosphate diphosphate-lyase [cyclizing, (−)-α-terpineol-forming]. This enzyme catalyses the following chemical reaction

geranyl diphosphate + H_{2}O $\rightleftharpoons$ (−)-α-terpineol + diphosphate

The enzyme has been characterized from Vitis vinifera (grape).
