= (E)-beta-ocimene synthase =

Class of enzymes

(E)-β-ocimene synthase

Identifiers
- EC no.: 4.2.3.106

Databases
- IntEnz: IntEnz view
- BRENDA: BRENDA entry
- ExPASy: NiceZyme view
- KEGG: KEGG entry
- MetaCyc: metabolic pathway
- PRIAM: profile
- PDB structures: RCSB PDB PDBe PDBsum
Search
- PMC: articles
- PubMed: articles
- NCBI: proteins

(E)-β-Ocimene synthase (EC 4.2.3.106, β-ocimene synthase, AtTPS03, ama0a23, LjEbetaOS, MtEBOS) is an enzyme with systematic name geranyl-diphosphate diphosphate-lyase ((E)-β-ocimene-forming). This enzyme catalyses the following chemical reaction

geranyl diphosphate $\rightleftharpoons$ (E)-β-ocimene + diphosphate

This enzyme is widely distributed in plants, which release β-ocimene when attacked by herbivorous insects.
