= (−)-alpha-pinene synthase =

Class of enzymes

(−)-α-pinene synthase

Identifiers
- EC no.: 4.2.3.119

Databases
- IntEnz: IntEnz view
- BRENDA: BRENDA entry
- ExPASy: NiceZyme view
- KEGG: KEGG entry
- MetaCyc: metabolic pathway
- PRIAM: profile
- PDB structures: RCSB PDB PDBe PDBsum
Search
- PMC: articles
- PubMed: articles
- NCBI: proteins

(−)-α-Pinene synthase (EC 4.2.3.119, (−)-α-pinene/(−)-camphene synthase, (−)-α-pinene cyclase) is an enzyme with systematic name geranyl-diphosphate diphosphate-lyase [cyclizing, (−)-α-pinene-forming]. This enzyme catalyses the following chemical reaction

geranyl diphosphate $\rightleftharpoons$ (−)-α-pinene + diphosphate

Cyclase II of Salvia officinalis (sage) gives about equal parts (−)-α-pinene, (−)-β-pinene and (−)-camphene.
