= Man in Black =

The Man in Black may refer to:

== People ==
- Johnny Cash (1932–2003), American singer, songwriter, musician, actor, and author
- Dale Earnhardt (1951-2001), American professional stock car driver and team owner
- Valentine Dyall (1908–1985), British actor, the original presenter of the BBC Radio series Appointment with Fear
- Peter Moore (serial killer) (born 1946), British serial killer
- Pietro Tacchi Venturi (1861–1956), papal liaison to Mussolini
- An association football referee, referring to the traditional match official's kit
- Ritchie Blackmore, English guitarist

== Entertainment ==
=== Music ===
- Man in Black (album), a 1971 album by Johnny Cash
  - "Man in Black" (song), on the album
- "The Man in Black", a 1974 instrumental by Cozy Powell

=== Other media ===
- The narrator of the BBC Radio series Appointment with Fear
- The Man in Black (film), a 1949 British thriller film
- Man in Black: His Own Story in His Own Words, Johnny Cash's autobiography
- The Man in Black: An Historical Novel of the Days of Queen Anne, an 1860 novel by G. P. R. James
- The Man in Black, an 1894 novel by Stanley J. Weyman
- The Man in Black, a 1965 Western novel by Marvin Albert
- The Man in Black, a ballet by James Kudelka
- The Man in Black, a strip in the British comics anthology Spike (DC Thomson)

=== Fictional characters ===
- Chaucer's Man in Black, from The Book of the Duchess
- Man in Black (Lost)
- Man in Black (Westworld)
- Randall Flagg, featured in several of Stephen King's novels
- Dr. Terence Wynn, in the Halloween film series
- Colonel Douglas Mortimer, in the western For a Few Dollars More, played by Lee Van Cleef

== See also ==
- List of people known as the Black
- The Traveller in Black, a collection of stories by John Brunner
- Men in Black (disambiguation)
- MIB (disambiguation)
