= (+)-alpha-pinene synthase =

Class of enzymes

(+)-α-pinene synthase

Identifiers
- EC no.: 4.2.3.121

Databases
- IntEnz: IntEnz view
- BRENDA: BRENDA entry
- ExPASy: NiceZyme view
- KEGG: KEGG entry
- MetaCyc: metabolic pathway
- PRIAM: profile
- PDB structures: RCSB PDB PDBe PDBsum
Search
- PMC: articles
- PubMed: articles
- NCBI: proteins

(+)-α-pinene synthase (EC 4.2.3.121, (+)-α-pinene cyclase, cyclase I) is an enzyme with systematic name geranyl-diphosphate diphosphate-lyase [cyclizing, (+)-α-pinene-forming]. This enzyme catalyses the following chemical reaction

geranyl diphosphate $\rightleftharpoons$ (+)-α-pinene + diphosphate

Cyclase I of Salvia officinalis (sage) gives about equal parts (+)-α-pinene and (+)-camphene.
