= (+)-camphene synthase =

Class of enzymes

Identifiers
- EC no.: 4.2.3.116

Databases
- IntEnz: IntEnz view
- BRENDA: BRENDA entry
- ExPASy: NiceZyme view
- KEGG: KEGG entry
- MetaCyc: metabolic pathway
- PRIAM: profile
- PDB structures: RCSB PDB PDBe PDBsum
Search
- PMC: articles
- PubMed: articles
- NCBI: proteins

(+)-camphene synthase (EC 4.2.3.116) is an enzyme with systematic name geranyl-diphosphate diphosphate-lyase [cyclizing, (+)-camphene-forming]. This enzyme catalyses the following chemical reaction

geranyl diphosphate $\rightleftharpoons$ (+)-camphene + diphosphate

Cyclase I of Salvia officinalis (sage) gives about equal parts (+)-camphene and (+)-alpha-pinene.
