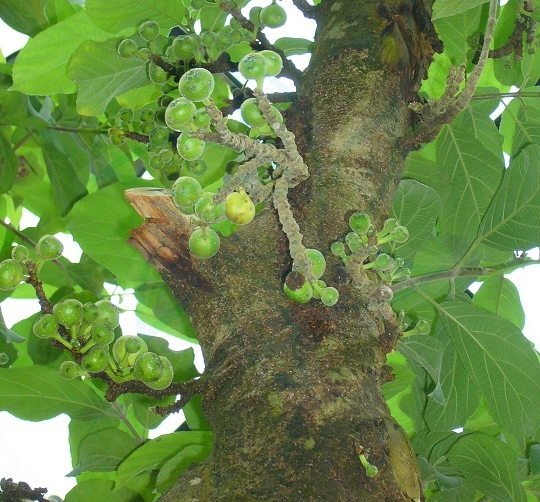

Conservation status
- Least Concern (IUCN 3.1)

Scientific classification
- Kingdom: Plantae
- Clade: Tracheophytes
- Clade: Angiosperms
- Clade: Eudicots
- Clade: Rosids
- Order: Rosales
- Family: Moraceae
- Genus: Ficus
- Subgenus: F. subg. Sycomorus
- Species: F. hispida

Binomial name
- Ficus hispida L.f.

Subspecies
- Ficus hispida var. hispida; Ficus hispida var. rubra Corner

Synonyms
- Synonymy: Covellia hispida (L.f.) Miq.; Gonosuke hispida (L.f.) Raf. synonyms of var. hispida: Covellia assamica Miq.; Covellia courtallensis Miq.; Covellia daemonum (J.Koenig ex Vahl) Miq.; Covellia dasycarpa Miq.; Covellia oppositifolia (Roxb.) Gasp.; Covellia setulosa Miq.; Covellia wightiana Miq.; Ficus compressa S.S.Chang; Ficus courtallensis (Miq.) Baill.; Ficus daemonum J.Koenig ex Vahl; Ficus fecunda Blume; Ficus hispida f. borneensis Miq.; Ficus hispida var. incana Kuntze; Ficus hispida f. obovifolia Hochr.; Ficus hispida var. viridis Kuntze; Ficus hispidioides S.Moore; Ficus letaqui H.Lév. & Vaniot; Ficus lima Royen ex Miq., not validly publ.; Ficus mollis Willd., nom. illeg. homonym. post.; Ficus oppositifolia Roxb.; Ficus perinteregam Pennant; Ficus poilanei Gagnep.; Ficus prominens Wall. ex Miq.; Ficus sambucixylon H.Lév.; Ficus scabra Jacq., nom. illeg. homonym. post.; Ficus symphytifolia Lam.; Sycomorphe roxburghii Miq.; Gonosuke demonum Raf.; Gonosuke scaber Raf.

= Ficus hispida =

Species of flowering plant

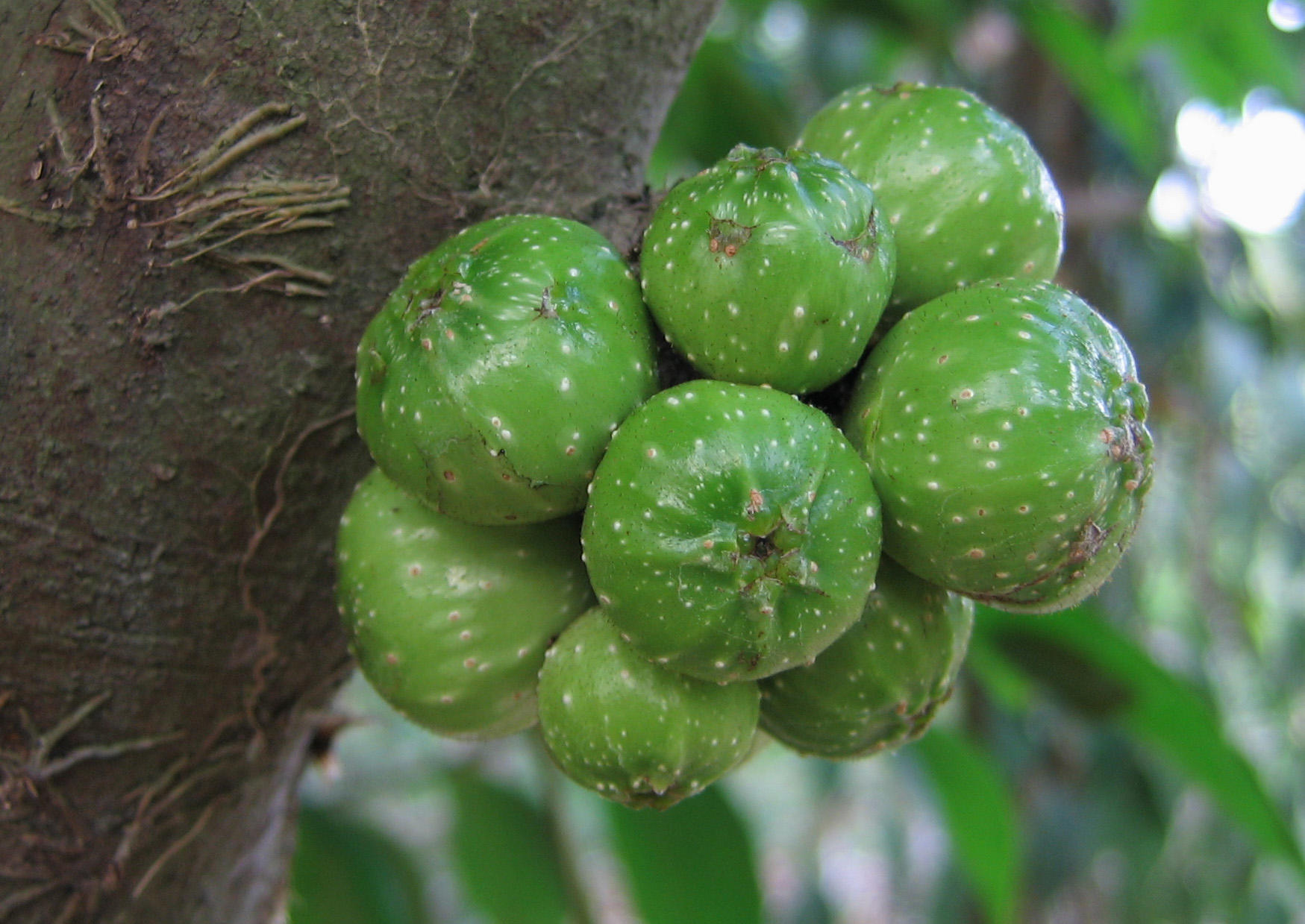
Fruits

Ficus hispida, also known as the opposite leaf Fig, is a small tree in the family Moraceae, with a distribution ranging from India and southern China southwards to northern Australia. It is morphologically gynodioecious, but functionally dioecious. Male trees are hermaphrodites with both staminate flowers that produce pollen and pistillate flowers that produce almost no seeds but can form galls containing pollinator wasp larvae. Female trees have pistillate flowers that do produce seeds but are inhospitable to pollinator wasp larvae.

It occurs in many parts of Asia and as far south east as Australia. There is a large variety of local common names. Like a number of ficus, the leaves are sandpapery to touch. An unusual feature is the figs which hang on long stems.

== Species associated with Ficus hispida ==
In Australia the fruit are eaten by cassowaries and double-eyed fig parrots. Phayre's leaf monkey feeds on the leaves as do the larvae of the moth Melanocercops ficuvorella. The fig wasp Apocrypta bakeri has F. hispida as its host, where it parasitizes the pollinator fig wasp Ceratosolen solmsi. The yet unnamed nematode species Caenorhabditis sp. 35 has been found in Aceh, Indonesia, associated with the tree. Caterpillars of the moth species Asota caricae have been recorded eating F. hispida. The caterpillars skeletonise the leaves.
