= 1,8-Cineole 2-exo-monooxygenase =

Class of enzymes

Identifiers
- EC no.: 1.14.14.56

Databases
- IntEnz: IntEnz view
- BRENDA: BRENDA entry
- ExPASy: NiceZyme view
- KEGG: KEGG entry
- MetaCyc: metabolic pathway
- PRIAM: profile
- PDB structures: RCSB PDB PDBe PDBsum
Search
- PMC: articles
- PubMed: articles
- NCBI: proteins

1,8-Cineole 2-exo-monooxygenase (EC 1.14.14.56, CYP3A4) is an enzyme with systematic name 1,8-cineole,NADPH:oxygen oxidoreductase (2-exo-hydroxylating). This enzyme catalyses the following chemical reaction

eucalyptol
+ NADPH + H^{+}
O_{2}
H_{2}O
2-exo-hydroxy-1,8-cineole
+ NADP^{+}

The four substrates of this enzyme are eucalyptol, reduced nicotinamide adenine dinucleotide phosphate (NADPH), oxygen, and a proton. Its products are 2-exo-hydroxy-1,8-cineole, oxidised NADP^{+}, and water. It is a cytochrome P450 protein containing heme.
