= François Stanislas Cloez =

French chemist

- Born: 24 June 1817
- Died: 12 October 1883 (aged 66)
- Citizenship: France
- Scientific career
- Fields: Chemistry
- Thesis: Recherches sur les éthers cyaniques et leurs isomères (1866)

François Stanislas Cloez (24 June 1817 – 12 October 1883) was a French chemist, who authored both as "F. S. Cloez" and "S. Cloez", and is known for his pioneering role in analytical chemistry during the 19th century. He was a founder and later president of the Chemistry Society of France.

In 1851, Cloez and Italian chemist Stanislao Cannizzaro, working on collaborative research, prepared cyanamide by the action of ammonia on cyanogen chloride in ethereal solution.

In the 1870s, he commenced the identification of the constituents of individual essential oils and their classification into groups according to their suitability for medicinal, industrial and perfumery purposes. He identified the major constituent of eucalyptus oil, which he called "eucalyptol" (now generally known as cineole). In honour of his work on eucalyptus oil Eucalyptus cloeziana (Gympie messmate) is named after him.

Cloez also played a role in developing a theory on the origin of life elsewhere in the Solar System.

In 1864, Cloez was the first scientist to examine a carbonaceous chondrite, the Orgueil meteorite, after it had fallen in France. Cloez said that its content "would seem to indicate the existence of organized substances in celestial bodies."

The Orgueil meteorite was subject to a hoax, when a sample of the meteorite was contaminated with a rush seed. The hoax was discovered in the 1960s when the meteorite was being examined for evidence of extraterrestrial biological material. There is no suggestion in literature that Cloez was party to this hoax.
