= Alpha-terpinene synthase =

α-terpinene synthase

Identifiers
- EC no.: 4.2.3.115

Databases
- IntEnz: IntEnz view
- BRENDA: BRENDA entry
- ExPASy: NiceZyme view
- KEGG: KEGG entry
- MetaCyc: metabolic pathway
- PRIAM: profile
- PDB structures: RCSB PDB PDBe PDBsum
Search
- PMC: articles
- PubMed: articles
- NCBI: proteins

α-Terpinene synthase (EC 4.2.3.115) is an enzyme with systematic name geranyl-diphosphate diphosphate-lyase (cyclizing, α-terpinene-forming). This enzyme catalyses the following chemical reaction

geranyl diphosphate $\rightleftharpoons$ α-terpinene + diphosphate

The enzyme has been characterized from Dysphania ambrosioides (American wormseed).
