= (+)-sabinene synthase =

Class of enzymes

Identifiers
- EC no.: 4.2.3.110

Databases
- IntEnz: IntEnz view
- BRENDA: BRENDA entry
- ExPASy: NiceZyme view
- KEGG: KEGG entry
- MetaCyc: metabolic pathway
- PRIAM: profile
- PDB structures: RCSB PDB PDBe PDBsum
Search
- PMC: articles
- PubMed: articles
- NCBI: proteins

(+)-Sabinene synthase (EC 4.2.3.110, SS) is an enzyme with systematic name geranyl-diphosphate diphosphate-lyase [cyclizing, (+)-sabinene-forming]. This enzyme catalyses the following chemical reaction

geranyl diphosphate $\rightleftharpoons$ (+)-sabinene + diphosphate

This enzyme is isolated from Salvia officinalis (sage).
