= (+)-beta-pinene synthase =

Enzyme

(+)-β-pinene synthase

Identifiers
- EC no.: 4.2.3.122

Databases
- IntEnz: IntEnz view
- BRENDA: BRENDA entry
- ExPASy: NiceZyme view
- KEGG: KEGG entry
- MetaCyc: metabolic pathway
- PRIAM: profile
- PDB structures: RCSB PDB PDBe PDBsum
Search
- PMC: articles
- PubMed: articles
- NCBI: proteins

(+)-β-Pinene synthase (EC 4.2.3.122, (+)-pinene cyclase, cyclase III) is an enzyme with systematic name geranyl-diphosphate diphosphate-lyase [(+)-β-pinene-forming]. This enzyme catalyses the following chemical reaction

geranyl diphosphate $\rightleftharpoons$ (+)-β-pinene + diphosphate

Cyclase III from Salvia officinalis (sage) gives roughly equal parts of (+)-β-pinene and (+)-α-pinene.
