= Tricyclene synthase =

Identifiers
- EC no.: 4.2.3.105

Databases
- IntEnz: IntEnz view
- BRENDA: BRENDA entry
- ExPASy: NiceZyme view
- KEGG: KEGG entry
- MetaCyc: metabolic pathway
- PRIAM: profile
- PDB structures: RCSB PDB PDBe PDBsum
Search
- PMC: articles
- PubMed: articles
- NCBI: proteins

Tricyclene synthase (EC 4.2.3.105, TPS3) is an enzyme with systematic name geranyl-diphosphate diphosphate-lyase (cyclizing; tricyclene-forming). This enzyme catalyses the following chemical reaction

geranyl diphosphate $\rightleftharpoons$ tricyclene + diphosphate

The enzyme from Solanum lycopersicum (tomato) gives a mixture of tricyclene, camphene, beta-myrcene and limonene.
