= Pepperwood =

Pepperwood may refer to:

- Pepperwood, an artist working in Switzerland
- Pepperwood Resorts, different exclusive Private Resorts in Thailand e.g. Pepperwood Garden, Pepperwood Palms and Pepperwood Orchid
- Zanthoxylum clava-herculis, American Pepperwood
- Pseudowintera, New Zealand Pepperwood
- Umbellularia californica
- Pepperwood, California, a small town in the United States
- Pepperwood, episode of season 2 of New Girl
