= (−)-endo-fenchol synthase =

Class of enzymes

Identifiers
- EC no.: 4.2.3.10
- CAS no.: 117758-41-5

Databases
- IntEnz: IntEnz view
- BRENDA: BRENDA entry
- ExPASy: NiceZyme view
- KEGG: KEGG entry
- MetaCyc: metabolic pathway
- PRIAM: profile
- PDB structures: RCSB PDB PDBe PDBsum
- Gene Ontology: AmiGO / QuickGO
Search
- PMC: articles
- PubMed: articles
- NCBI: proteins

The enzyme (−)-endo-Fenchol synthase (EC 4.2.3.10) catalyzes the chemical reaction

geranyl diphosphate + H_{2}O $\rightleftharpoons$ (−)-endo-fenchol + diphosphate

This enzyme belongs to the family of lyases, specifically those carbon-oxygen lyases acting on phosphates. The systematic name of this enzyme class is geranyl-diphosphate diphosphate-lyase [cyclizing, (−)-endo-fenchol-forming]. Other names in common use include (−)-endo-fenchol cyclase, and geranyl pyrophosphate:(−)-endo-fenchol cyclase. This enzyme participates in monoterpenoid biosynthesis.
