= Coke Studio =

Coke Studio may refer to:

- Coke Studio Pakistan, a Pakistani television series featuring live music performances
- Coke Studio Bharat, an Indian music series featuring live music performances
- Coke Studio Africa, an African music series featuring live music performances
- Coke Studio Tamil, a Tamil-language music series blending traditional and contemporary sounds
- Coke Studio Bangla, a Bangladeshi music series featuring live music performances
- Coke Studio Bel 3arabi, a music television series in the Middle East and North Africa
- Coke Studio Philippines, a Philippines television series featuring live music performances
- Coke Studios, or MyCoke, a defunct online chat game used for marketing the Coca-Cola brand
