= (R)-limonene synthase =

Class of enzymes

Identifiers
- EC no.: 4.2.3.20

Databases
- IntEnz: IntEnz view
- BRENDA: BRENDA entry
- ExPASy: NiceZyme view
- KEGG: KEGG entry
- MetaCyc: metabolic pathway
- PRIAM: profile
- PDB structures: RCSB PDB PDBe PDBsum
Search
- PMC: articles
- PubMed: articles
- NCBI: proteins

The enzyme (R)-limonene synthase (EC 4.2.3.20) catalyzes the reversible chemical reaction

- geranyl diphosphate $\rightleftharpoons$ (+)-(4R)-limonene + diphosphate.

== Description ==
This enzyme belongs to the family of lyases, specifically those carbon-oxygen lyases acting on phosphates. The systematic name of this enzyme class is Geranyl-diphosphate diphosphate-lyase [cyclizing, (+)-(4R)-limonene-forming]. Other names in common use include Limonene synthase, and Geranyldiphosphate diphosphate lyase [(+)-(R)-limonene-forming].

The enzyme participates in monoterpenoid biosynthesis and is localized to Leucoplasts of oil gland secretory cells.
