= 1,8-Cineole 2-endo-monooxygenase =

Class of enzymes

Identifiers
- EC no.: 1.14.14.133

Databases
- IntEnz: IntEnz view
- BRENDA: BRENDA entry
- ExPASy: NiceZyme view
- KEGG: KEGG entry
- MetaCyc: metabolic pathway
- PRIAM: profile
- PDB structures: RCSB PDB PDBe PDBsum
Search
- PMC: articles
- PubMed: articles
- NCBI: proteins

1,8-Cineole 2-endo-monooxygenase (EC 1.14.14.133, Formerly EC 1.14.13.156, P450cin, CYP176A, CYP176A1) is an enzyme with systematic name 1,8-cineole,NADPH:oxygen oxidoreductase (2-endo-hydroxylating). This enzyme catalyses the following chemical reaction

1,8-cineole + NADPH + H^{+} + O_{2} $\rightleftharpoons$ 2-endo-hydroxy-1,8-cineole + NADP^{+} + H_{2}O

1,8-Cineole 2-endo-monooxygenase is a heme-thiolate protein (P-450).
