= Chew and spit =

Behavior associated with several eating disorders

Chew and spit (sometimes abbreviated as CHSP or CS) is a compensatory behavior associated with several eating disorders that involves chewing food and spitting it out before swallowing, often as an attempt to avoid ingesting unwanted or unnecessary calories. CS can be used as a way to taste food viewed as “forbidden” or unhealthy. Individuals who partake in CS typically have an increased desire for thinness, increased loss of control (LOC) and body dissatisfaction. CS can replace vomiting and/or binging behaviors, or serve as an additional behavior to many eating disorders.

CS has been found in several different eating disorders, making it difficult to find a treatment that works as a cure-all. There is no defined treatment for CS; however, cognitive behavioral therapy (CBT) has been shown to reduce negative behaviors involved in eating disorders including bulimia nervosa and anorexia nervosa.

A recent systematic review on the topic revealed seven themes identified in scholarly articles, including potential markers of eating disorder severity (regardless of the length of illness contributing to age discrimination). Individuals suffering from CS also showed increased loss of control (LOC), pathological eating, negative emotions and feelings, and body image distortion. CS sufferers may be trans-diagnostic (i.e. appears in individuals who have been diagnosed with any type of clinical or sub-clinical eating disorder).

== Consequences and treatments ==
Chewing and spitting is often associated with and may be a potential gateway to more severe eating disorder behaviors. Individuals who use CS as a compensatory behavior are more likely to be diagnosed with or develop eating disorders. The likelihood is dependent upon the severity of food obsession present. Treatments to eliminate the behavior of chewing and spitting have not yet been developed. However, given the correlation with eating disorders, research suggests that treatments that are used for eating disorders, such as cognitive behavioral therapy, may also be effective for eliminating chew and spit behaviors.

== Frequency and tendency ==
In studies relating to chewing and spitting, it was seen that 34% of individuals with eating disorders partake in CS. It has also been found that younger individuals are more likely to participate in CS, and that CS does not determine personality or activity outside of eating behaviors. Overall, CS contributes to body dissatisfaction, while body dissatisfaction in turn contributes to CS. CS has also been seen to occur in episodes, rather than consistently. These episodes have been seen to be days to weeks long.

== Research ==
Chew and spit has not received much research attention regarding treatment, long term effects, and its associations with other behaviors and eating disorders. More research is needed on this topic to further understand the effect that this behavior has on individuals physically and psychologically.
