= C's =

The C's may refer to:

- Boston Celtics, an American professional basketball team, known as "The C's"
- Citizens (Spanish political party), a post-nationalist political party in Spain
