= (−)-camphene synthase =

Class of enzymes

Identifiers
- EC no.: 4.2.3.117

Databases
- IntEnz: IntEnz view
- BRENDA: BRENDA entry
- ExPASy: NiceZyme view
- KEGG: KEGG entry
- MetaCyc: metabolic pathway
- PRIAM: profile
- PDB structures: RCSB PDB PDBe PDBsum
Search
- PMC: articles
- PubMed: articles
- NCBI: proteins

(−)-camphene synthase (EC 4.2.3.117, CS) is an enzyme with systematic name geranyl-diphosphate diphosphate-lyase [cyclizing, (−)-camphene-forming]. This enzyme catalyses the following chemical reaction

geranyl diphosphate $\rightleftharpoons$ (−)-camphene + diphosphate

(−)-Camphene is the major product in Abies grandis (grand fir) with traces of other monoterpenoids.
