= All-trans-nonaprenyl-diphosphate synthase (geranyl-diphosphate specific) =

Class of enzymes

Identifiers
- EC no.: 2.5.1.84

Databases
- IntEnz: IntEnz view
- BRENDA: BRENDA entry
- ExPASy: NiceZyme view
- KEGG: KEGG entry
- MetaCyc: metabolic pathway
- PRIAM: profile
- PDB structures: RCSB PDB PDBe PDBsum
Search
- PMC: articles
- PubMed: articles
- NCBI: proteins

All-trans-nonaprenyl-diphosphate synthase (geranyl-diphosphate specific) (EC 2.5.1.84, nonaprenyl diphosphate synthase, solanesyl diphosphate synthase, SolPP synthase, SPP-synthase, SPP synthase, solanesyl-diphosphate synthase, OsSPS2) is an enzyme with systematic name geranyl-diphosphate:isopentenyl-diphosphate transtransferase (adding 7 isopentenyl units). This enzyme catalyses the following chemical reaction

geranyl diphosphate + 7 isopentenyl diphosphate $\rightleftharpoons$ 7 diphosphate + all-trans-nonaprenyl diphosphate

This enzyme is involved in the synthesis of the side chain of menaquinone-9.
