= Sabinene-hydrate synthase =

sabinene-hydrate synthase

Identifiers
- EC no.: 4.2.3.11
- CAS no.: 166800-09-5

Databases
- IntEnz: IntEnz view
- BRENDA: BRENDA entry
- ExPASy: NiceZyme view
- KEGG: KEGG entry
- MetaCyc: metabolic pathway
- PRIAM: profile
- PDB structures: RCSB PDB PDBe PDBsum
- Gene Ontology: AmiGO / QuickGO
Search
- PMC: articles
- PubMed: articles
- NCBI: proteins

The enzyme sabinene-hydrate synthase (EC 4.2.3.11) catalyzes the chemical reaction

geranyl diphosphate + H_{2}O $\rightleftharpoons$ sabinene hydrate + diphosphate

This enzyme belongs to the family of lyases, specifically those carbon-oxygen lyases acting on phosphates. The systematic name of this enzyme class is geranyl-diphosphate diphosphate-lyase (cyclizing, sabinene-hydrate-forming). This enzyme is also called sabinene hydrate cyclase. This enzyme participates in monoterpenoid biosynthesis.
