= Vetispiradiene synthase =

Enzyme from Egyptian henbane

Identifiers
- EC no.: 4.2.3.21

Databases
- IntEnz: IntEnz view
- BRENDA: BRENDA entry
- ExPASy: NiceZyme view
- KEGG: KEGG entry
- MetaCyc: metabolic pathway
- PRIAM: profile
- PDB structures: RCSB PDB PDBe PDBsum
Search
- PMC: articles
- PubMed: articles
- NCBI: proteins

Vetispiradiene synthase (EC 4.2.3.21) is an enzyme from Egyptian henbane that catalyzes the following chemical reaction:

(2E,6E)-farnesyl diphosphate $\rightleftharpoons$ vetispiradiene + diphosphate

This enzyme belongs to the family of lyases, specifically those carbon-oxygen lyases acting on phosphates. The systematic name of this enzyme class is (2E,6E)-farnesyl-diphosphate diphosphate-lyase (cyclizing, vetispiradiene-forming). Other names in common use include vetispiradiene-forming farnesyl pyrophosphate cyclase, pemnaspirodiene synthase, HVS, and vetispiradiene cyclase. This enzyme participates in terpenoid biosynthesis.
