= 2-methylisoborneol synthase =

Class of enzymes

Identifiers
- EC no.: 4.2.3.118

Databases
- IntEnz: IntEnz view
- BRENDA: BRENDA entry
- ExPASy: NiceZyme view
- KEGG: KEGG entry
- MetaCyc: metabolic pathway
- PRIAM: profile
- PDB structures: RCSB PDB PDBe PDBsum
Search
- PMC: articles
- PubMed: articles
- NCBI: proteins

2-methylisoborneol synthase (EC 4.2.3.118, sco7700, 2-MIB cyclase, MIB synthase, MIBS) is an enzyme with systematic name (E)-2-methylgeranyl-diphosphate diphosphate-lyase (cyclizing, 2-methylisoborneol-forming). This enzyme catalyses the following chemical reaction

(E)-2-methylgeranyl diphosphate + H_{2}O $\rightleftharpoons$ 2-methylisoborneol + diphosphate

The product, 2-methylisoborneol, is a characteristic odiferous compound with a musty smell produced by soil microorganisms.
