= Copalyl diphosphate synthase =

copalyl diphosphate synthase

Identifiers
- EC no.: 5.5.1.12
- CAS no.: 157972-08-2

Databases
- IntEnz: IntEnz view
- BRENDA: BRENDA entry
- ExPASy: NiceZyme view
- KEGG: KEGG entry
- MetaCyc: metabolic pathway
- PRIAM: profile
- PDB structures: RCSB PDB PDBe PDBsum
- Gene Ontology: AmiGO / QuickGO
Search
- PMC: articles
- PubMed: articles
- NCBI: proteins

In enzymology, a copalyl diphosphate synthase (EC 5.5.1.12) is an enzyme that catalyzes the chemical reaction

geranylgeranyl diphosphate $\rightleftharpoons$ (+)-copalyl diphosphate

Hence, this enzyme has one substrate, geranylgeranyl diphosphate, and one product, (+)-copalyl diphosphate.

This enzyme belongs to the family of isomerases, specifically the class of intramolecular lyases. The systematic name of this enzyme class is (+)-copalyl-diphosphate lyase (decyclizing). This enzyme participates in diterpenoid biosynthesis.
