= Taxadiene synthase =

taxadiene synthase

Identifiers
- EC no.: 4.2.3.17
- CAS no.: 169277-52-5

Databases
- IntEnz: IntEnz view
- BRENDA: BRENDA entry
- ExPASy: NiceZyme view
- KEGG: KEGG entry
- MetaCyc: metabolic pathway
- PRIAM: profile
- PDB structures: RCSB PDB PDBe PDBsum
- Gene Ontology: AmiGO / QuickGO
Search
- PMC: articles
- PubMed: articles
- NCBI: proteins

The enzyme taxadiene synthase (EC 4.2.3.17) catalyzes the chemical reaction

geranylgeranyl diphosphate $\rightleftharpoons$ taxa-4,11-diene + diphosphate

This enzyme belongs to the family of lyases, specifically those carbon-oxygen lyases acting on phosphates. The systematic name of this enzyme class is geranylgeranyl-diphosphate diphosphate-lyase (cyclizing, taxa-4,11-diene-forming). Other names in common use include geranylgeranyl-diphosphate diphosphate-lyase (cyclizing, and taxadiene-forming). This enzyme participates in diterpenoid biosynthesis. The crystal structure of the enyme was the first of a diterpene cyclase and was reported by the research group of David W. Christianson at the University of Pennsylvania.
