= Pinene synthase =

pinene synthase

Identifiers
- EC no.: 4.2.3.14

Databases
- IntEnz: IntEnz view
- BRENDA: BRENDA entry
- ExPASy: NiceZyme view
- KEGG: KEGG entry
- MetaCyc: metabolic pathway
- PRIAM: profile
- PDB structures: RCSB PDB PDBe PDBsum
- Gene Ontology: AmiGO / QuickGO
Search
- PMC: articles
- PubMed: articles
- NCBI: proteins

In enzymology, a pinene synthase (EC 4.2.3.14) is an enzyme that catalyzes the chemical reaction

geranyl diphosphate $\rightleftharpoons$ pinene + diphosphate

Hence, this enzyme has one substrate, geranyl diphosphate, and two products, pinene and diphosphate.

This enzyme belongs to the family of lyases, specifically those carbon-oxygen lyases acting on phosphates. The systematic name of this enzyme class is geranyl-diphosphate diphosphate-lyase (cyclizing, pinene-forming). Other names in common use include beta-geraniolene synthase, (−)-(1S,5S)-pinene synthase, and geranyldiphosphate diphosphate lyase (pinene forming). This enzyme participates in monoterpenoid biosynthesis.
