= Myrcene synthase =

myrcene synthase

Identifiers
- EC no.: 4.2.3.15

Databases
- IntEnz: IntEnz view
- BRENDA: BRENDA entry
- ExPASy: NiceZyme view
- KEGG: KEGG entry
- MetaCyc: metabolic pathway
- PRIAM: profile
- PDB structures: RCSB PDB PDBe PDBsum
- Gene Ontology: AmiGO / QuickGO
Search
- PMC: articles
- PubMed: articles
- NCBI: proteins

The enzyme myrcene synthase (EC 4.2.3.15) catalyzes the chemical reaction

geranyl diphosphate $\rightleftharpoons$ myrcene + diphosphate

This enzyme belongs to the family of lyases, specifically those carbon-oxygen lyases acting on phosphates. The systematic name of this enzyme class is geranyl-diphosphate diphosphate-lyase (myrcene-forming). This enzyme participates in monoterpenoid biosynthesis.
