= R-linalool synthase =

Identifiers
- EC no.: 4.2.3.26

Databases
- IntEnz: IntEnz view
- BRENDA: BRENDA entry
- ExPASy: NiceZyme view
- KEGG: KEGG entry
- MetaCyc: metabolic pathway
- PRIAM: profile
- PDB structures: RCSB PDB PDBe PDBsum
Search
- PMC: articles
- PubMed: articles
- NCBI: proteins

The enzyme R-linalool synthase (EC 4.2.3.26) catalyzes the chemical reaction

geranyl diphosphate + H_{2}O $\rightleftharpoons$ (3R)-linalool + diphosphate

This enzyme belongs to the family of lyases, specifically those carbon-oxygen lyases acting on phosphates. The systematic name of this enzyme class is geranyl-diphosphate diphosphate-lyase [(3R)-linalool-forming]. Other names in common use include (3R)-linalool synthase, and (−)-3R-linalool synthase.
