= (4S)-limonene synthase =

Class of enzymes

Identifiers
- EC no.: 4.2.3.16

Databases
- IntEnz: IntEnz view
- BRENDA: BRENDA entry
- ExPASy: NiceZyme view
- KEGG: KEGG entry
- MetaCyc: metabolic pathway
- PRIAM: profile
- PDB structures: RCSB PDB PDBe PDBsum
- Gene Ontology: AmiGO / QuickGO
Search
- PMC: articles
- PubMed: articles
- NCBI: proteins

The enzyme (4S)-limonene synthase (EC 4.2.3.16) catalyzes the chemical reaction

geranyl diphosphate $\rightleftharpoons$ (−)-(4S)-limonene + diphosphate

This enzyme belongs to the family of lyases, specifically those carbon-oxygen lyases acting on phosphates. The systematic name of this enzyme class is geranyl-diphosphate diphosphate-lyase [cyclizing, (−)-(4S)-limonene-forming]. Other names in common use include (−)-(4S)-limonene synthase, 4S-(−)-limonene synthase, geranyldiphosphate diphosphate lyase (limonene forming), geranyldiphosphate diphosphate lyase [cyclizing,, and (4S)-limonene-forming]. This enzyme participates in monoterpenoid biosynthesis.
