= S-linalool synthase =

Identifiers
- EC no.: 4.2.3.25

Databases
- IntEnz: IntEnz view
- BRENDA: BRENDA entry
- ExPASy: NiceZyme view
- KEGG: KEGG entry
- MetaCyc: metabolic pathway
- PRIAM: profile
- PDB structures: RCSB PDB PDBe PDBsum
Search
- PMC: articles
- PubMed: articles
- NCBI: proteins

The enzyme S-linalool synthase (EC 4.2.3.25) catalyzes the chemical reaction

geranyl diphosphate + H_{2}O $\rightleftharpoons$ (3S)-linalool + diphosphate

This enzyme belongs to the family of lyases, specifically those carbon-oxygen lyases acting on phosphates. The systematic name of this enzyme class is geranyl-diphosphate diphosphate-lyase [(3S)-linalool-forming]. Other names in common use include LIS, Lis, and 3S-linalool synthase.
