= Geranyl pyrophosphate =

- Skeletal formula

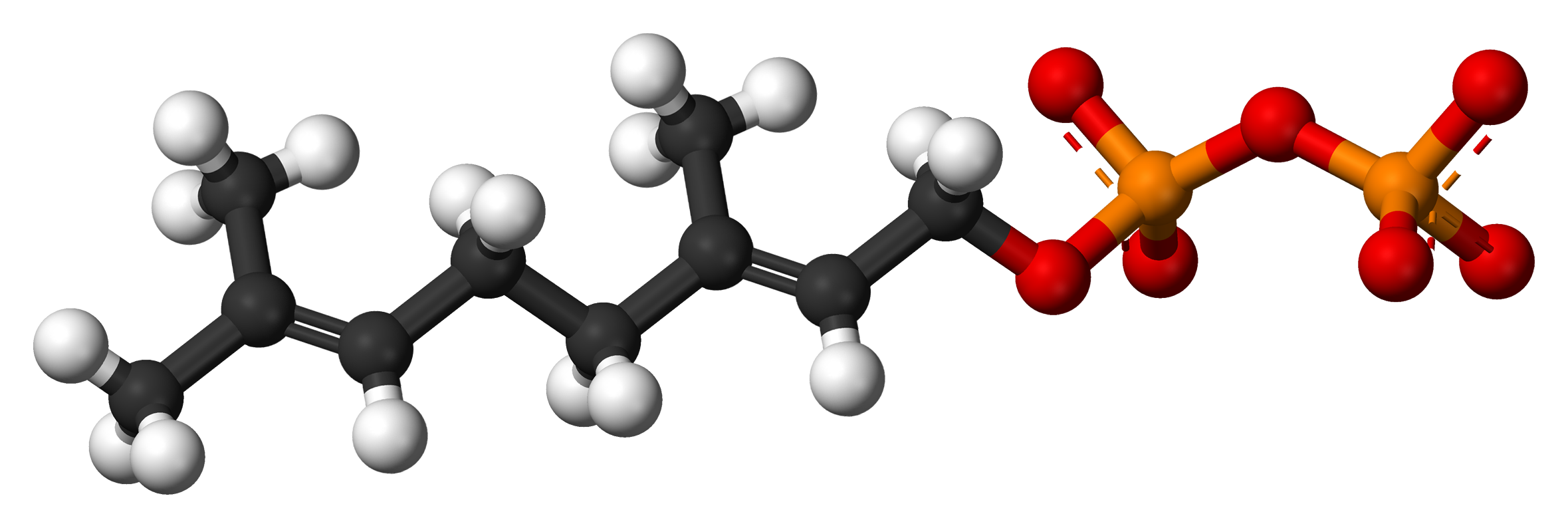
- Ball-and-stick model

Names
- Preferred IUPAC name (2E)-3,7-Dimethylocta-2,6-dien-1-yl trihydrogen diphosphate

Identifiers
CAS Number	763-10-0
3D model (JSmol)	Interactive image
ChEBI	CHEBI:17211
ChEMBL	ChEMBL41342
ChemSpider	393471
DrugBank	DB02552
IUPHAR/BPS	3051
MeSH	Geranyl+pyrophosphate
PubChem CID	445995
UNII	7X7DBM66JG
CompTox Dashboard (EPA)	DTXSID801315430
- InChI: InChI=1S/C10H20O7P2/c1-9(2)5-4-6-10(3)7-8-16-19(14,15)17-18(11,12)13/h5,7H,4,6,8H2,1-3H3,(H,14,15)(H2,11,12,13)/b10-7+ Key: GVVPGTZRZFNKDS-JXMROGBWSA-N; InChI=1/C10H20O7P2/c1-9(2)5-4-6-10(3)7-8-16-19(14,15)17-18(11,12)13/h5,7H,4,6,8H2,1-3H3,(H,14,15)(H2,11,12,13)/b10-7+ Key: GVVPGTZRZFNKDS-JXMROGBWBE
- SMILES: O=P(O)(O)OP(=O)(OC/C=C(/CC\C=C(/C)C)C)O

Properties
Chemical formula	C_{10}H_{17}O_{7}P_{2}
Molar mass	311.19
- Except where otherwise noted, data are given for materials in their standard state (at 25 °C [77 °F], 100 kPa). verify (what is ?) Infobox references

Geranyl pyrophosphate (GPP), also known as geranyl diphosphate (GDP), is the pyrophosphate ester of the terpenoid geraniol. Its salts are colorless. It is a precursor to many thousands of natural products.

== Occurrence ==
GPP is an intermediate in the isoprenoid biosynthesis pathway that produces longer prenyl chains such as farnesyl pyrophosphate and geranylgeranyl pyrophosphate as well as many terpenes. It can be prepared in the laboratory from geraniol.

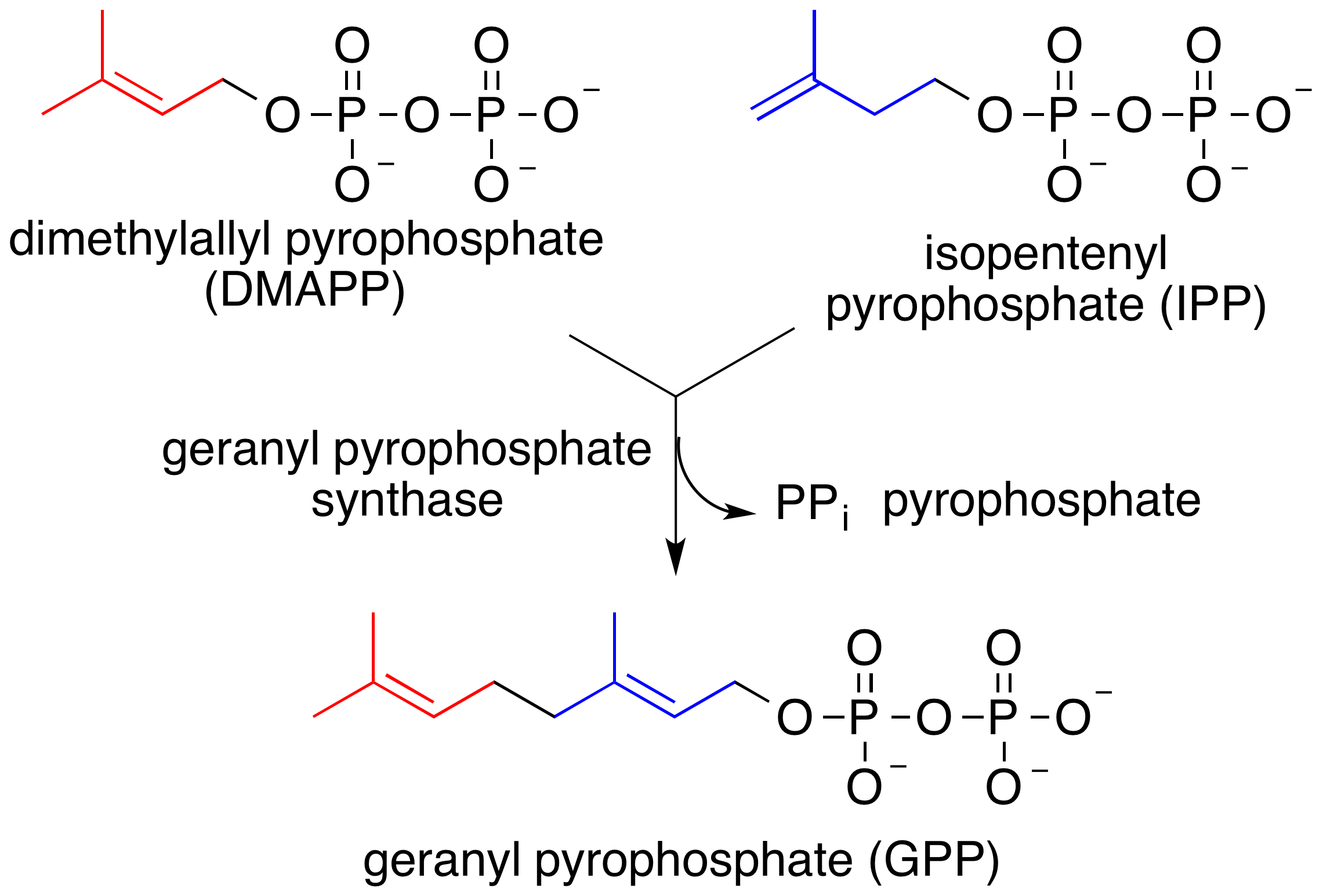
Isopentenyl pyrophosphate (IPP) and dimethylallyl pyrophosphate (DMAPP) are condensed by geranyl pyrophosphate synthase (dimethylallyltranstransferase) to produce geranyl pyrophosphate (GPP) and pyrophosphate. The carbon skeletons of DMAPP and IPP have been colored to indicate their location in GPP.

== Microbial toxicity ==
Intracellularly produced GPP has been shown to be toxic to E. coli at moderate doses.

== Related compounds ==
- Geraniol
- Farnesyl pyrophosphate
- Geranylgeranyl pyrophosphate

== See also ==
- Dimethylallyltranstransferase
