= Ironbark =

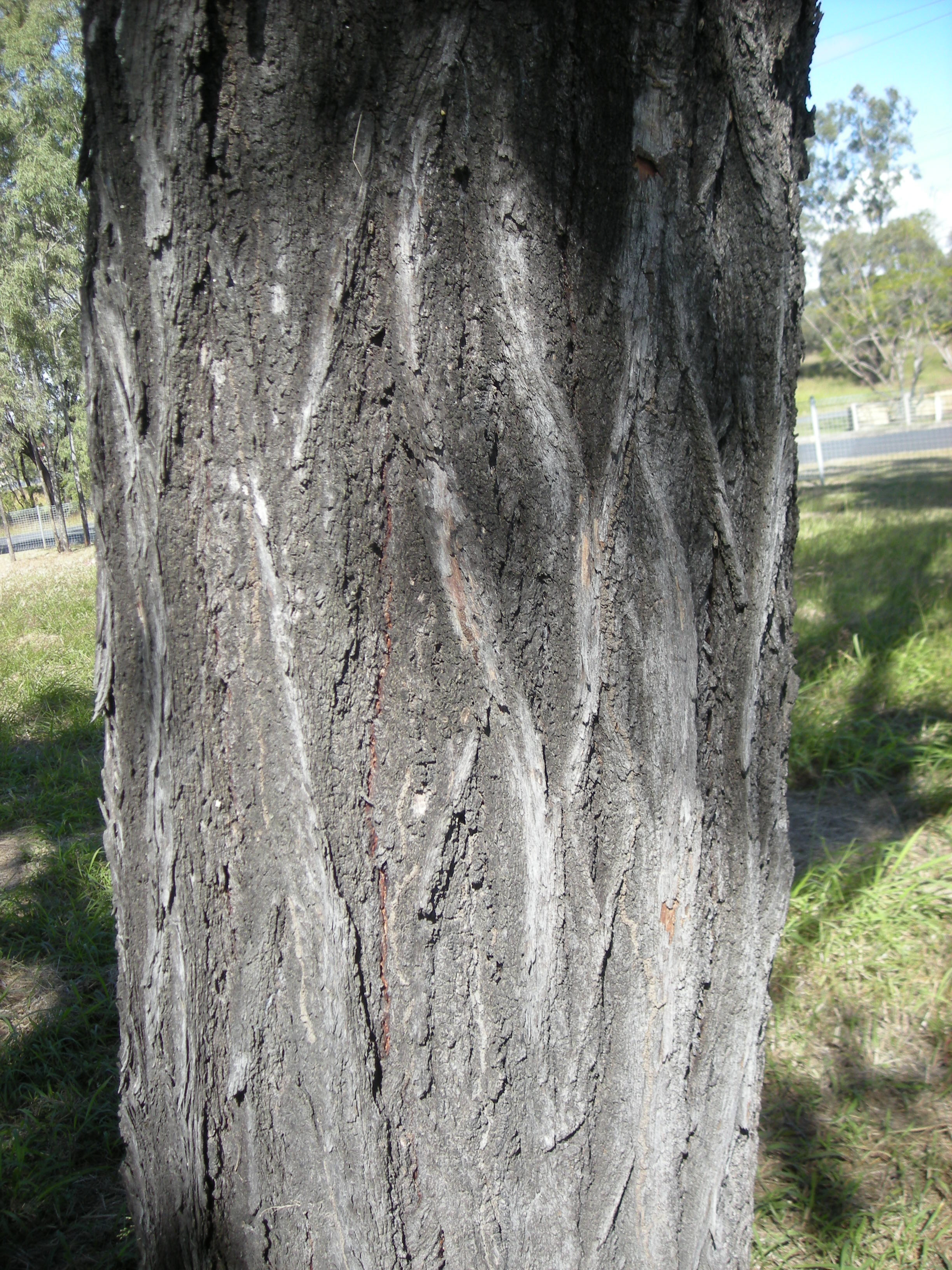
E. crebra bark

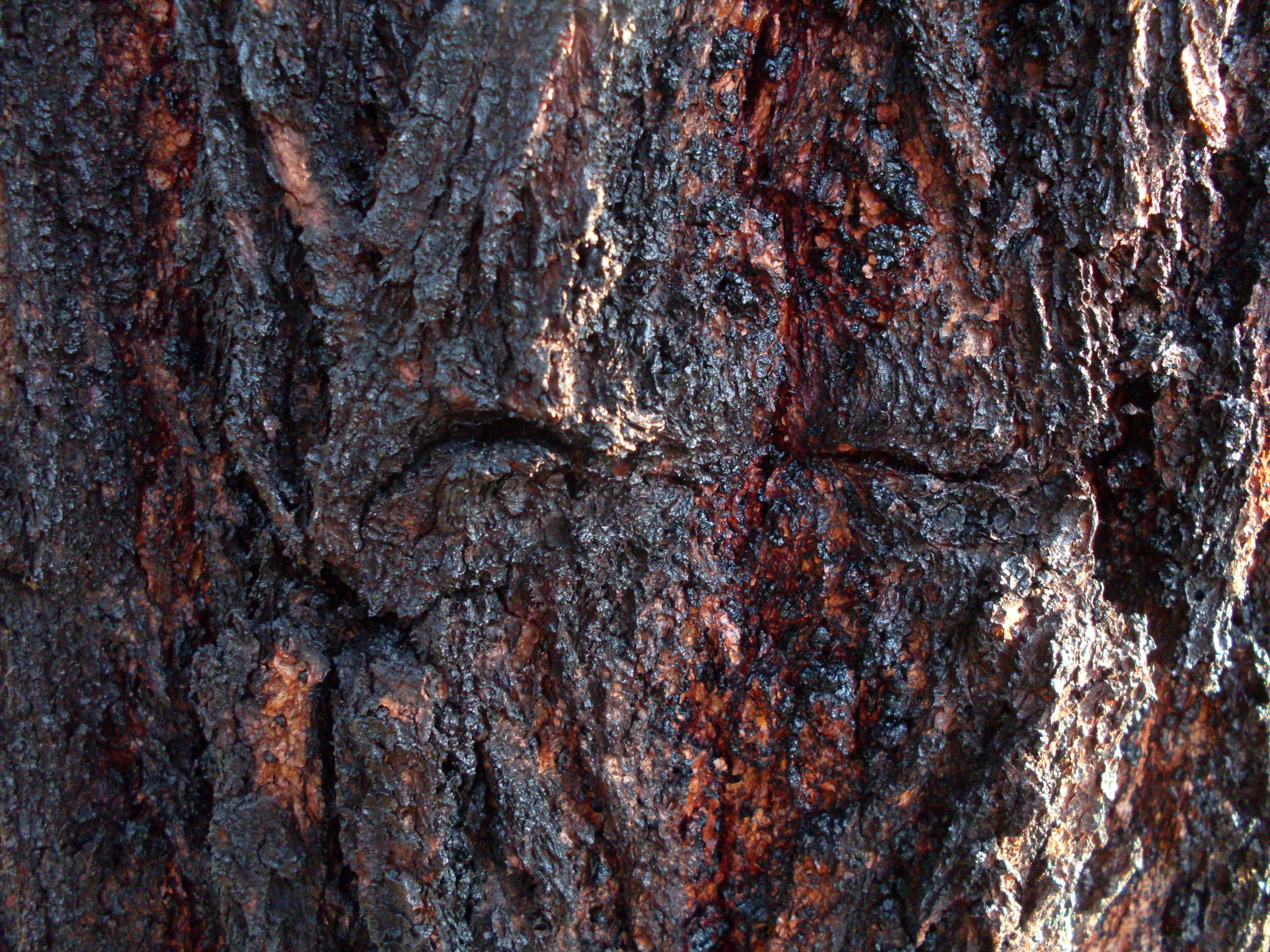
Close up of Ironbark

Ironbark is a common name of a number of species in three taxonomic groups within the genus Eucalyptus that have dark, deeply furrowed bark.

Instead of being shed annually as in many of the other species of Eucalyptus, the dead bark accumulates on the trees, forming the fissures. It becomes rough after drying out and becomes impregnated with kino (red gum), a dark red tree sap exuded by the tree. The tree is so named for the apparent resemblance of its bark to iron slag. The bark is resistant to fire and heat and protects the living tissue within the trunk and branches from fire. In cases of extreme fire, where leaves and shoots are removed, the protective bark aids in protecting epicormic buds which allow the tree to reshoot.

Being a very dense, hard wood, a length of ironbark is often used as a bug shoe on the bottom of a ship's skeg to protect it from shipworms. Ironbark was widely used in the piles of 19th and early 20th century bridges and wharves in New Zealand. It was widely used for railway sleepers in eastern Australia in the 19th and 20th centuries due to its durability; while other timber sleepers had to be replaced every 7-12 years, ironbark could last 30 years.

== Examples of ironbark species ==
- Eucalyptus ancophila L.A.S.Johnston & K.D.Hill
- Eucalyptus atrata L.A.S.Johnston & K.D.Hill Herberton ironbark, blue-leaved ironbark
- Eucalyptus beaniana L.A.S.Johnson & K.D.Hill Bean's ironbark
- Eucalyptus caleyi Maiden Caley's ironbark, drooping ironbark
- Eucalyptus corynodes A.R. Bean & Brooker
- Eucalyptus crebra F.Muell. narrow-leaved ironbark or narrow-leaved red ironbark
- Eucalyptus cullenii Cambage Cullen's ironbark
- Eucalyptus decolor A.R.Bean & Brooker
- Eucalyptus decorticans (F.M.Bailey) Maiden gum-topped ironbark
- Eucalyptus dura L.A.S. Johnson & K.D.Hill
- Eucalyptus exilipes Brooker & A.R.Bean fine-leaved ironbark
- Eucalyptus farinosa K.D.Hill
- Eucalyptus fibrosa F. Muell. broad-leaved (red) ironbark, blue-leaved ironbark
- Eucalyptus fusiformis Boland & Kleinig grey ironbark
- Eucalyptus granitica L.A.S.Johnson & K.D.Hill granite ironbark
- Eucalyptus indurata Brooker & Hopper ironbark
- Eucalyptus jensenii Maiden Wandi ironbark
- Eucalyptus melanoleuca S.T.Blake Yarraman ironbark or nanango ironbark
- Eucalyptus melanophloia F.Muell. silver-leaved ironbark
- Eucalyptus ophitica L.A.S.Johnson & K.D.Hill serpentine ironbark
- Eucalyptus panda S.T. Blake tumbledown ironbark, Yetman ironbark
- Eucalyptus paniculata Sm. grey ironbark
- Eucalyptus paedoglauca L.A.S.Johnson & Blaxell Mount Stuart ironbark
- Eucalyptus placita L.A.S.Johnson & K.D.Hill grey ironbark
- Eucalyptus quadricostata Brooker square-fruited ironbark
- Eucalyptus rhombica A.R.Bean & Brooker
- Eucalyptus scopulorum K.D.Hill
- Eucalyptus shirleyi Maiden Shirleys's silver leaved ironbark
- Eucalyptus sicilifolia L.A.S.Johnson & K.D.Hill
- Eucalyptus siderophloia Benth. northern grey ironbark
- Eucalyptus sideroxylon A.Cunn. ex Woolls mugga ironbark
- Eucalyptus staigeriana F.Muell. ex Bailey lemon-scented ironbark
- Eucalyptus suffulgens L.A.S.Johnson & K.D.Hill
- Eucalyptus taurina A.R.Bean & Brooker Helidon ironbark
- Eucalyptus tricarpa (L.A.S.Johnson) L.A.S.Johnson & K.D.Hill red ironbark
- Eucalyptus virens Brooker & A.R.Bean shiny-leaved ironbark
- Eucalyptus whitei Maiden & Blakely White's ironbark

== See also ==
- Ironwood
