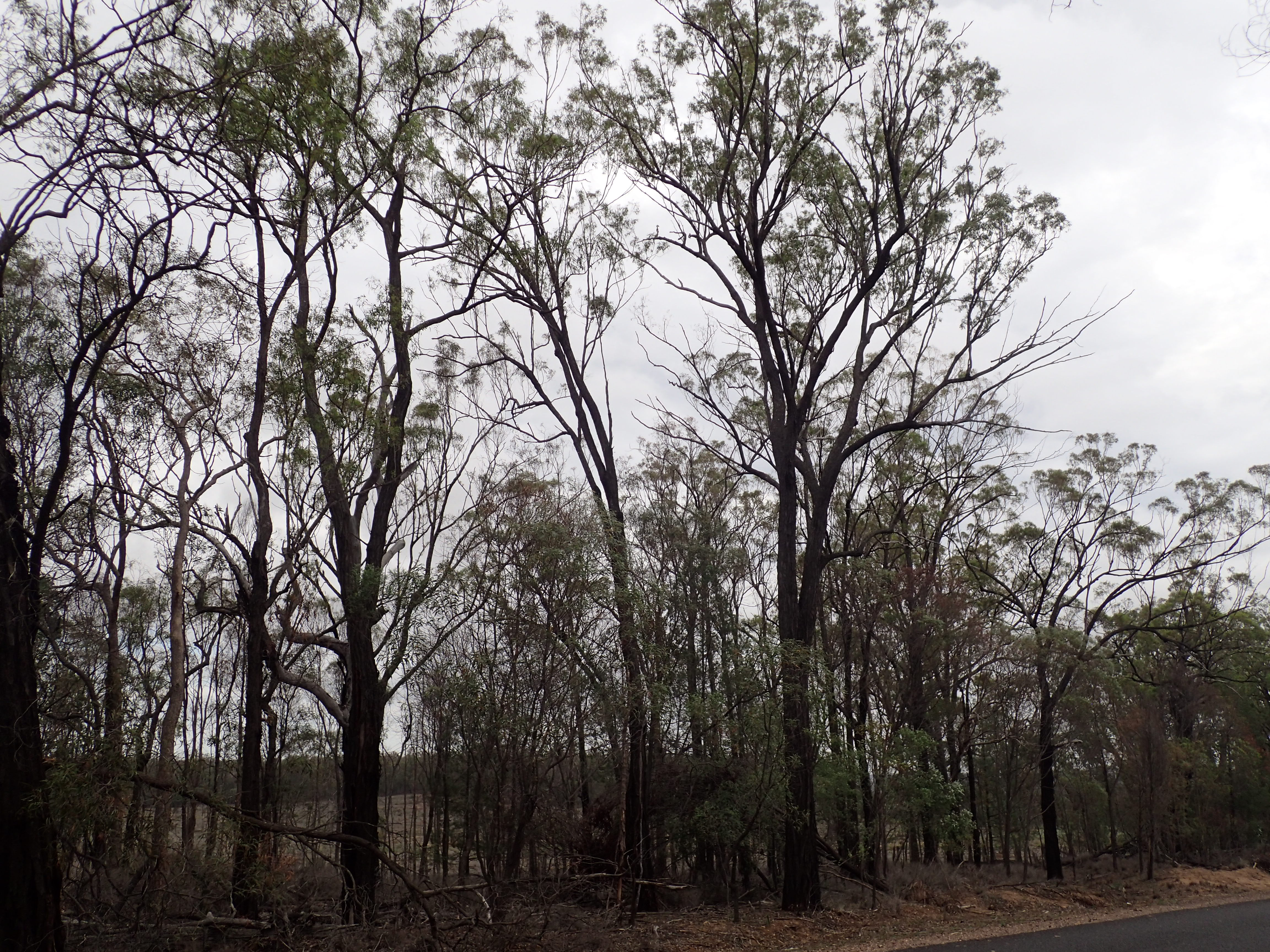
- Eucalyptus rhombica near Karara

Scientific classification
- Kingdom: Plantae
- Clade: Embryophytes
- Clade: Tracheophytes
- Clade: Spermatophytes
- Clade: Angiosperms
- Clade: Eudicots
- Clade: Rosids
- Order: Myrtales
- Family: Myrtaceae
- Genus: Eucalyptus
- Species: E. rhombica

Binomial name
- Eucalyptus rhombica A.R.Bean & Brooker

= Eucalyptus rhombica =

Species of eucalyptus

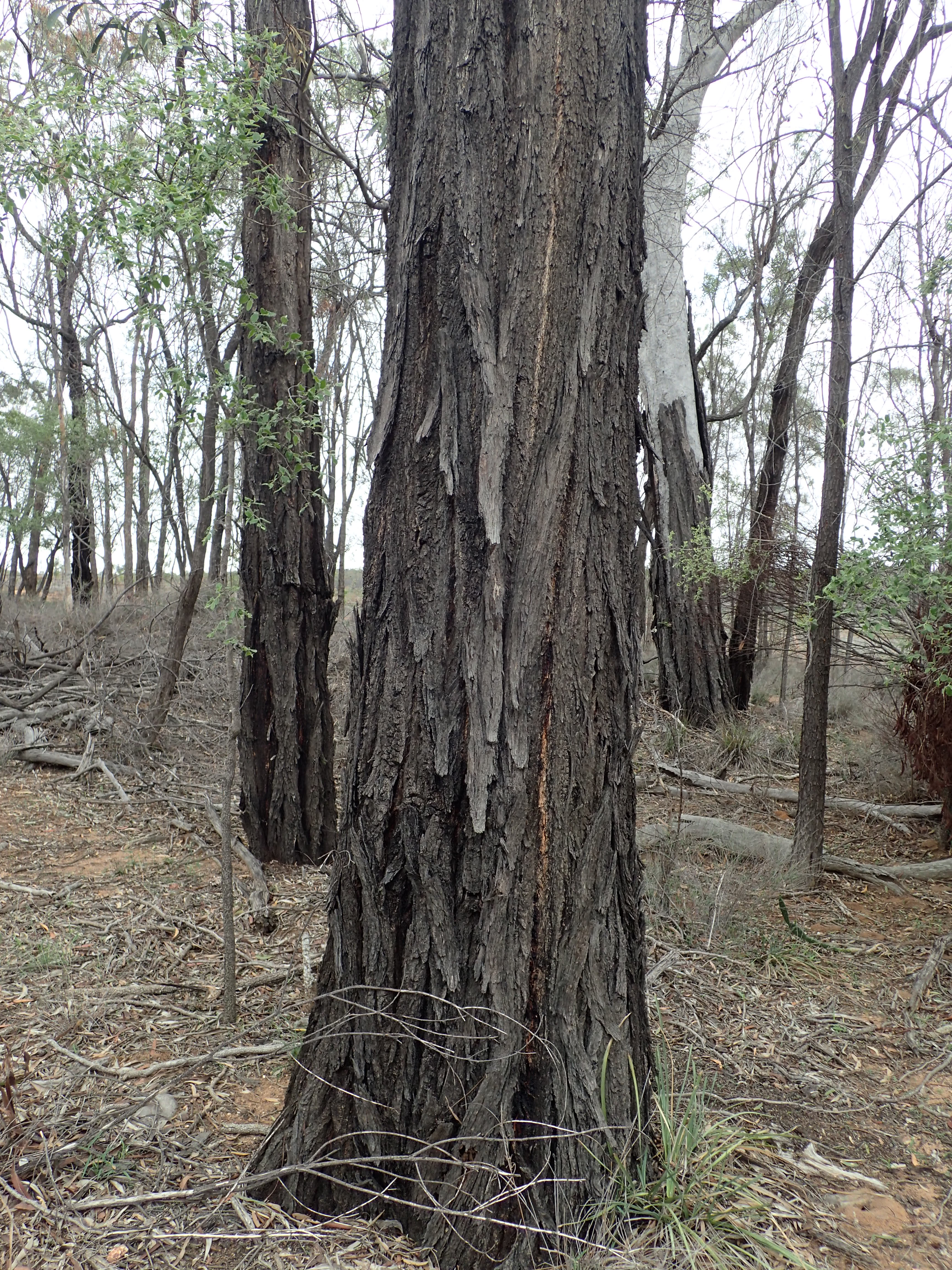
Bark

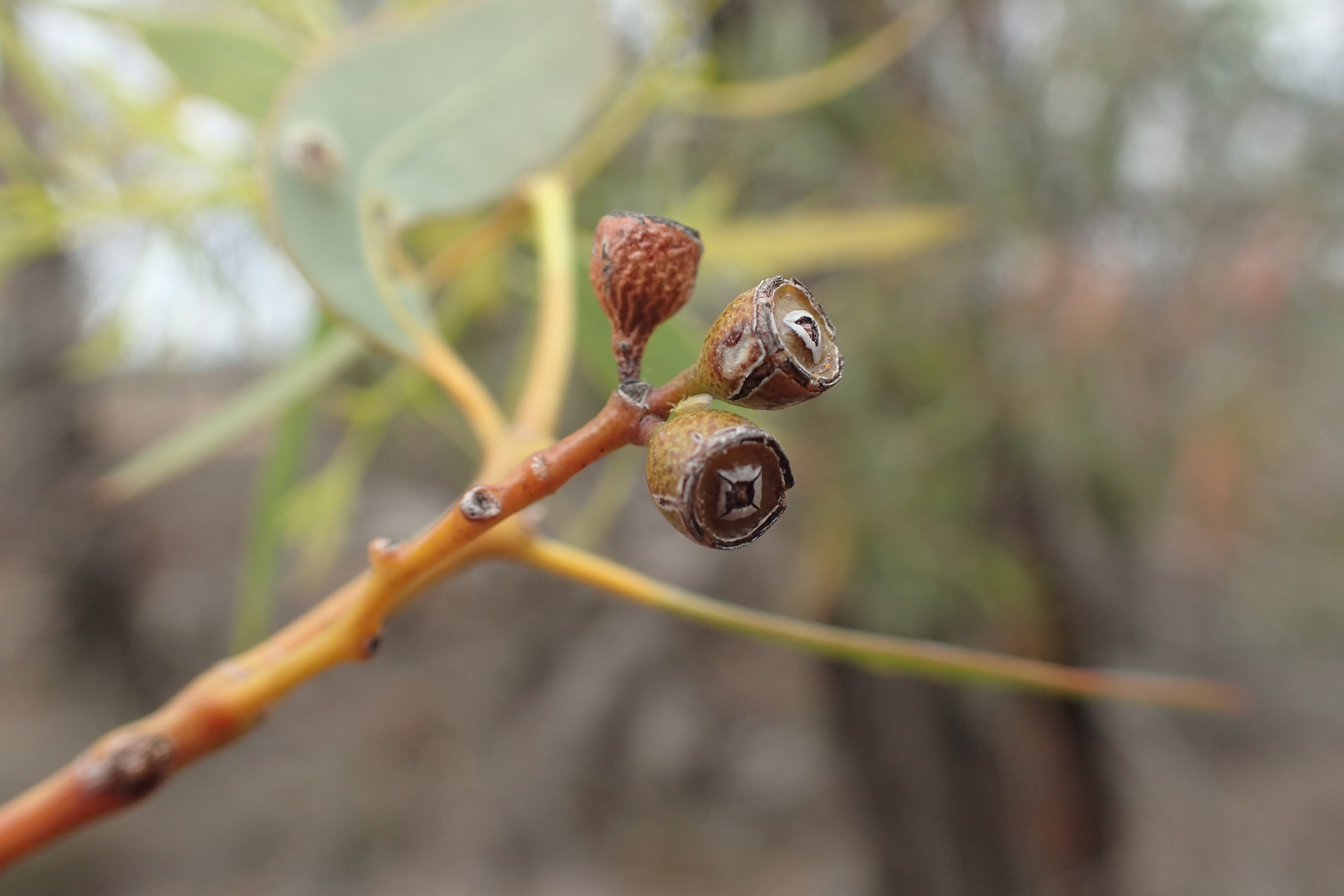
Fruit

Eucalyptus rhombica is a small to medium-sized tree that is endemic to a small area of south-east Queensland. It has rough, ironbark on the trunk and larger branches, smooth bark above, lance-shaped adult leaves, flower buds in groups of seven, white flowers and cup-shaped or conical fruit.

== Description ==
Eucalyptus rhombica is a tree that typically grows to a height of 20 m (66 ft) and forms a lignotuber. It has rough grey or black ironbark on the trunk and larger branches, sometimes smooth bark on the thinner branches. Young plants and coppice regrowth have egg-shaped to broadly lance-shaped, dull bluish green leaves that are 65–100 mm (2.6–3.9 in) long and 20–30 mm (0.79–1.18 in) wide and petiolate. Adult leaves are lance-shaped to broadly lance-shaped, the same shade of dull greyish green on both sides, 90–150 mm (3.5–5.9 in) long and 15–35 mm (0.59–1.38 in) wide tapering to a petiole 15–27 mm (0.59–1.06 in) long. The flower buds are arranged on the ends of branchlets in groups of seven on a branched peduncle 10–25 m (33–82 ft) long, the individual buds on pedicels 5–10 mm (0.20–0.39 in) long. Mature buds are diamond-shaped, 8–14 mm (0.31–0.55 in) long and 5–6 mm (0.20–0.24 in) wide with a conical operculum. Flowering occurs from September to March and the flowers are white. The fruit is a woody, cup-shaped or conical capsule 7–10 mm (0.28–0.39 in) long and wide with the valves near rim level.

== Taxonomy and naming ==
Eucalyptus rhombica was first formally described in 1994 by Anthony Bean and Ian Brooker in the journal Austrobaileya from material collected in the Hungry Hills State Forest near Ceratodus. The specific epithet (rhombica) is from the Latin rhombicus, referring to the shape of the flower buds.

== Distribution and habitat ==
This eucalypt is restricted to three areas near Toowoomba, Gayndah and Taroom, where it grows in sandy soil.

== Conservation status ==
This eucalypt is listed as "least concern" under the Queensland Government Nature Conservation Act 1992.

== See also ==
- List of Eucalyptus species
