= Eucalyptus decolor =

Scientific classification
- Kingdom: Plantae
- Clade: Tracheophytes
- Clade: Angiosperms
- Clade: Eudicots
- Clade: Rosids
- Order: Myrtales
- Family: Myrtaceae
- Genus: Eucalyptus
- Species: E. decolor

Binomial name
- Eucalyptus decolor A.R.Bean & Brooker

Species of eucalyptus

Eucalyptus decolor is a species of small to medium-sized tree that is endemic to Queensland. It has rough, hard, fissured "ironbark", lance-shaped to curved adult leaves that are distinctly paler on the lower surface, flower buds in groups of seven, white flowers and hemispherical to cup-shaped fruit.

== Description ==
Eucalyptus decolor is a tree that typically grows to a height of 25 m (82 ft) and forms a lignotuber. It has hard, dark grey fissured "ironbak" on the trunk and larger branches, white to pinkish bark on the thinner branches. Young plants and coppice regrowth have narrow lance-shaped leaves 95–135 mm (3.7–5.3 in) long and 7–16 mm (0.28–0.63 in) wide. Adult leaves are lance-shaped to curved, distinctly paler on the lower surface, 65–130 mm (2.6–5.1 in) long and 8–22 mm (0.31–0.87 in) wide on a petiole 10–20 mm (0.39–0.79 in) long. The flower buds are arranged on a branching inflorescence with the buds in groups of seven on each branch. The groups are on a peduncle 6–15 mm (0.24–0.59 in) long, the individual buds on a pedicel 2–3 mm (0.079–0.118 in) long. Mature buds are spindle-shaped to diamond-shaped, about 4 mm (0.16 in) long and 2–3 mm (0.079–0.118 in) wide with a conical operculum. Flowering occurs from December to March and the flowers are white. The fruit is a woody hemispherical to cup-shaped capsule 4–5 mm (0.16–0.20 in) long and 4–6 mm (0.16–0.24 in) wide on a pedicel 1–4 mm (0.039–0.157 in) long.

== Taxonomy and naming ==
Eucalyptus decolor was first formally described in 1989 by Anthony Bean and Ian Brooker from a specimen that Bean collected on Mount Castletower near Port Curtis. The description was published in the journal Austrobaileya. The specific epithet (decolor) is a Latin word meaning "discolored" or "faded", referring to the pale underside of the leaves.

== Distribution and habitat ==
This eucalypt is only known from a few small populations, mostly in hilly and mountainous country in south-east Queensland.

== Conservation status ==
Eucalyptus decolor is classed as "near threatened" under the Queensland Government Nature Conservation Act 1992. The main threats to the species are land clearing and inappropriate fire regimes.

== See also ==
- List of Eucalyptus species
