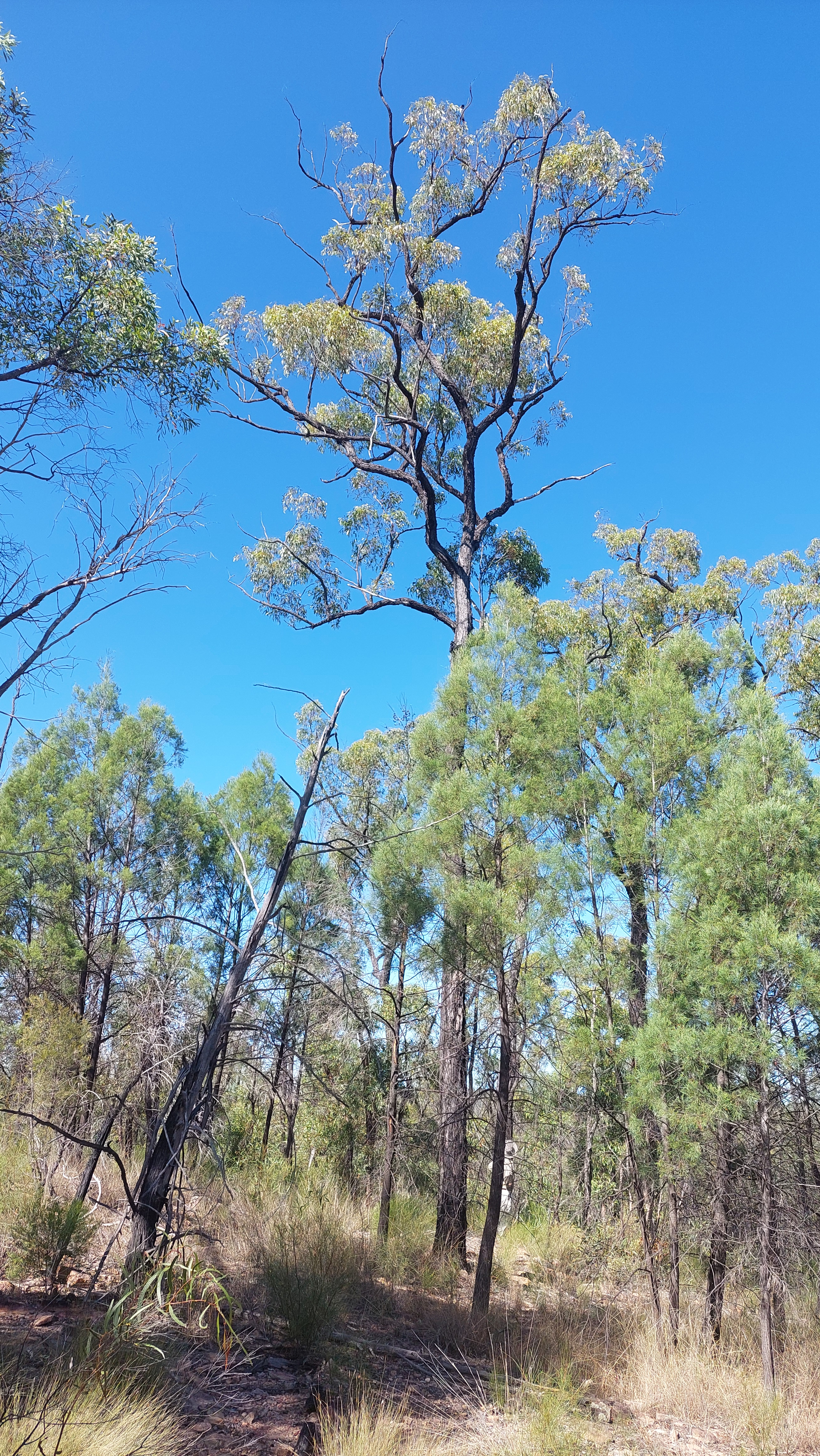
- Mature tree

Conservation status
- Near Threatened (IUCN 3.1)

- Vulnerable (EPBC Act)

Scientific classification
- Kingdom: Plantae
- Clade: Tracheophytes
- Clade: Angiosperms
- Clade: Eudicots
- Clade: Rosids
- Order: Myrtales
- Family: Myrtaceae
- Genus: Eucalyptus
- Species: E. virens

Binomial name
- Eucalyptus virens Brooker & A.R.Bean
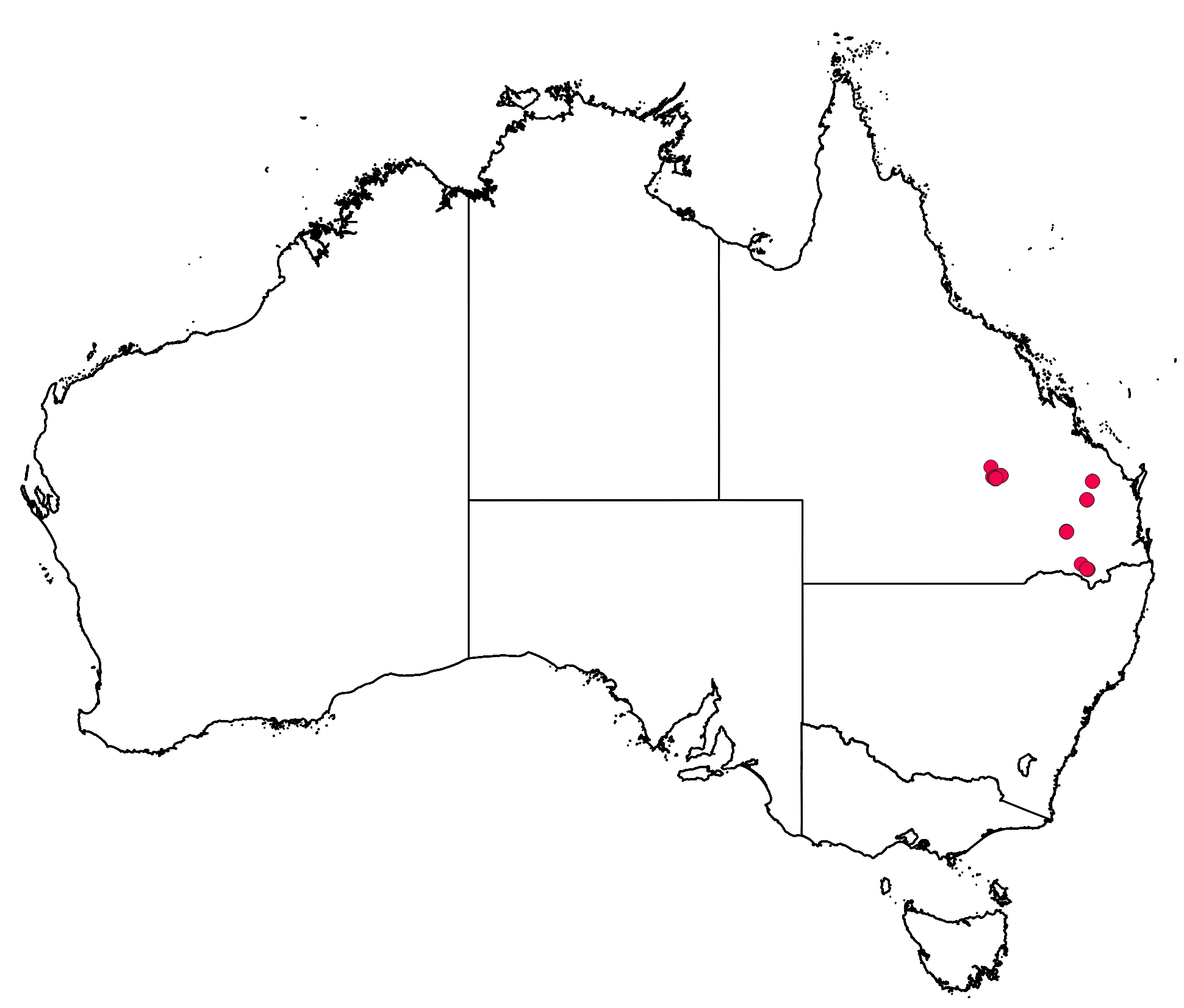
- Distribution data from Australasian Virtual Herbarium

= Eucalyptus virens =

Shiny-leaved ironbark

Species of eucalyptus

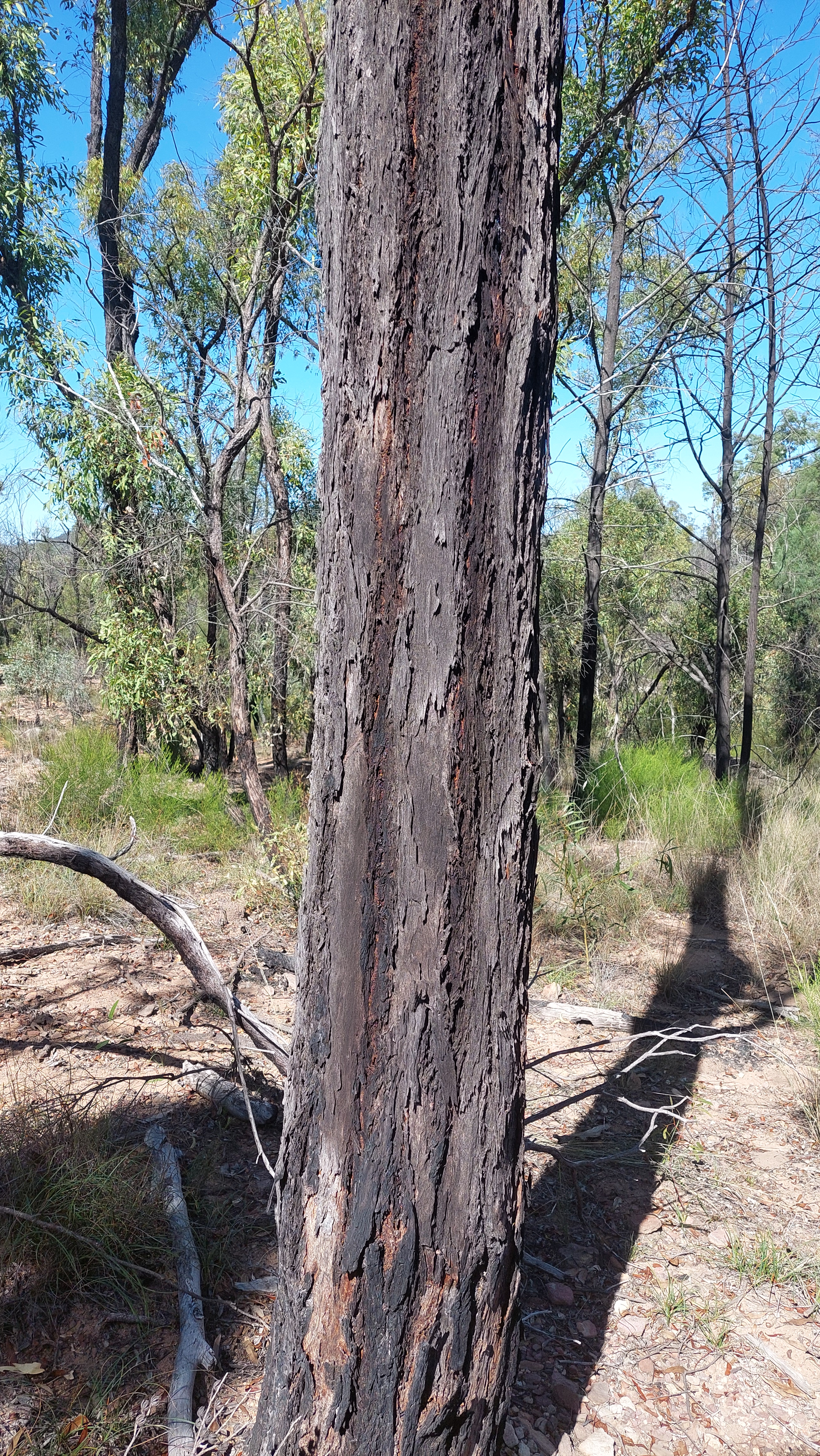
Bark

Eucalyptus virens, commonly known as the shiny-leaved ironbark, is a species of small to medium-sized tree that is endemic to Queensland. It has hard ironbark on the trunk and branches, narrow lance-shaped adult leaves, flower buds in groups of seven, white flowers and hemispherical fruit.

== Description ==
Eucalyptus virens is a tree that typically grows to a height of 25 m (82 ft) and forms a lignotuber. It has rough, grey to black, furrowed ironbark on its trunk and branches. Young plants and coppice regrowth have glossy green, lance-shaped leaves that are 40–70 mm (1.6–2.8 in) long and 10–16 mm (0.39–0.63 in) wide. Adult leaves are the same shade of glossy green on both sides, narrow lance-shaped, 55–110 mm (2.2–4.3 in) long and 9–20 mm (0.35–0.79 in) wide, tapering to a petiole 10–22 mm (0.39–0.87 in) long. The flower buds are arranged on the ends of branchlets in groups of seven on a branched peduncle 6–15 mm (0.24–0.59 in) long, the individual buds on pedicels 2–5 mm (0.079–0.197 in) long. Mature buds are oval, 5–6 mm (0.20–0.24 in) long and 4–5 mm (0.16–0.20 in) wide with a conical to rounded operculum. Flowering has been recorded in February and the flowers are white. The fruit is a woody, hemispherical capsule 4–6 mm (0.16–0.24 in) long and 4–7 mm (0.16–0.28 in) wide with the valves near rim level.

== Taxonomy and naming ==
Eucalyptus virens was first formally described in 1987 by Ian Brooker and Anthony Bean in the journal Brunonia from specimens collected near Injune in 1975. The specific epithet (virens) is a Latin word meaning "green", referring to the bright green leaves.

== Distribution and habitat ==
The shiny-leaved ironbark grows in open forest on sandy soil on flats and undulating country. It is only known from three small populations near the Maranoa River, Tara and Inglewood in south-eastern Queensland.

== Conservation status ==
This eucalypt is classified as "vulnerable" under the Australian Government Environment Protection and Biodiversity Conservation Act 1999 and the Queensland Government Nature Conservation Act 1992. The main threats to the species are timber harvesting and habitat loss due to land clearing.

== See also ==
- List of Eucalyptus species
