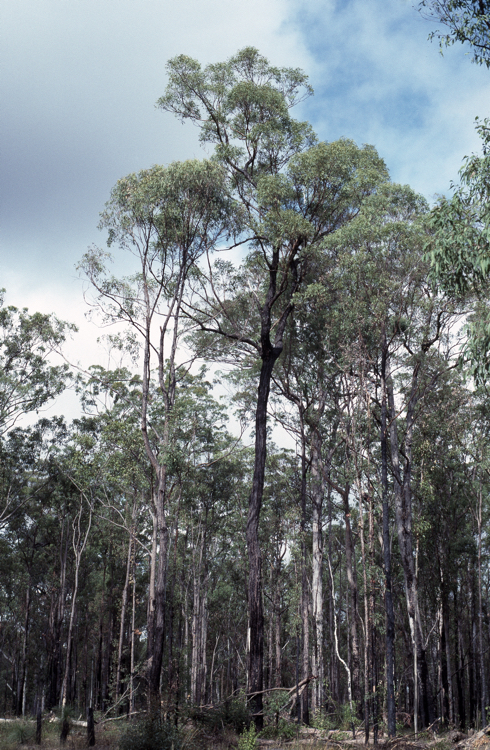

Conservation status
- Near Threatened (IUCN 3.1)

- Endangered (EPBC Act)

Scientific classification
- Kingdom: Plantae
- Clade: Tracheophytes
- Clade: Angiosperms
- Clade: Eudicots
- Clade: Rosids
- Order: Myrtales
- Family: Myrtaceae
- Genus: Eucalyptus
- Species: E. taurina

Binomial name
- Eucalyptus taurina A.R.Bean & Brooker

= Eucalyptus taurina =

Species of eucalyptus

Eucalyptus taurina, commonly known as Helidon ironbark, is a species of medium-sized to tall ironbark that is endemic to Queensland. It has rough ironbark on the trunk and sometimes the larger branches, smooth bark above, lance-shaped adult leaves, flower buds in groups of seven, white flowers and conical to hemispherical fruit.

== Description ==
Eucalyptus taurina is a tree that typically grows to a height of 22 m (72 ft) and forms a lignotuber. It has rough, dark grey to black ironbark on the trunk, sometimes also the larger branches, and smooth bark above. Young plants and coppice regrowth have stems that are square in cross-section and lance shaped leaves that are much paler on the lower surface, 80–140 mm (3.1–5.5 in) long and 14–30 mm (0.55–1.18 in) wide. Adult leaves are lance-shaped, 75–150 mm (3.0–5.9 in) long and 15–30 mm (0.59–1.18 in) wide, tapering to a petiole 10–25 mm (0.39–0.98 in) long. The flower buds are arranged in the ends of branchlets in groups of seven on a branching peduncle 4–7 mm (0.16–0.28 in) long, the individual buds sessile or on pedicels up to 5 mm (0.20 in) long. Mature buds are oval to spindle-shaped or cylindrical, 6–8 mm (0.24–0.31 in) long and 3–4 mm (0.12–0.16 in) wide with a conical to rounded operculum. Flowering has been observed in October and November and the flowers are white. The fruit is a woody conical to hemispherical capsule 5–7 mm (0.20–0.28 in) long and wide with the valves protruding.

== Taxonomy and naming ==
Eucalyptus taurina was first described in 1994 by Anthony Bean and Ian Brooker in the journal Austrobaileya from specimens they collected near Helidon in 1990. The specific epithet (taurina) is from the Latin word taurinus meaning "of bulls", an allusion to the author's experience when first seeing this species.

== Distribution and habitat ==
Helidon ironbark is found in two separate areas, one north of Helidon and the other near Crows Nest. It grows with other eucalypt species on ridges in shallow soil.

== Conservation status ==
''Eucalyptus taurina is listed as "endangered" under the Australian Government Environment Protection and Biodiversity Conservation Act 1999 and the Queensland Government Nature Conservation Act 1992. The IUCN Red List assesses the species as Near Threatened.

== See also ==
- List of Eucalyptus species
