= Eucalyptus subtilis =

Narrow-leaved mallee

Scientific classification
- Kingdom: Plantae
- Clade: Tracheophytes
- Clade: Angiosperms
- Clade: Eudicots
- Clade: Rosids
- Order: Myrtales
- Family: Myrtaceae
- Genus: Eucalyptus
- Species: E. subtilis

Binomial name
- Eucalyptus subtilis Brooker & Hopper

Species of eucalyptus

Eucalyptus subtilis, commonly known as narrow-leaved mallee, is a species of mallee that is endemic to Western Australia. It has smooth bark, linear adult leaves, flower buds in groups of nine or eleven, cream-coloured flowers and usually cup-shaped fruit.

== Description ==
Eucalyptus subtilis is a mallee that typically grows to a height of 1–3 m (3 ft 3 in – 9 ft 10 in) and forms a lignotuber. It has smooth grey to light pale orange coloured bark. Young plants and coppice regrowth have dull green to bluish leaves that are 45–85 mm (1.8–3.3 in) long and 3–10 mm (0.12–0.39 in) wide. Adult leaves are arranged alternately, held erect, dull to slightly glossy green, linear, 45–80 mm (1.8–3.1 in) long and 4–7 mm (0.16–0.28 in) wide with a pointed apex and the base tapering toward a petiole 3–7 mm (0.12–0.28 in) long. The flower buds are arranged in leaf axils on an unbranched peduncle 4–10 mm (0.16–0.39 in) long, the individual buds on pedicels up to 3 mm (0.12 in) long. Mature buds are spindle-shaped, 6–8 mm (0.24–0.31 in) long and 2–3 mm (0.079–0.118 in) wide with a conical operculum. Flowering occurs between February and June and the flowers are cream-coloured or white. The fruit is a woody cup-shaped to shortly barrel-shaped capsule 4–6 mm (0.16–0.24 in) long and 3–5 mm (0.12–0.20 in) wide with the valves near rim level.

== Taxonomy and naming ==
Eucalyptus subtilis was first formally described by the botanists Ian Brooker and Stephen Hopper in 1991 in the journal Nuytsia from specimens collected by Brooker south of Norseman in 1985. The specific epithet is taken from the Latin word subtilis meaning "fine" or "delicate" in reference to the leaves of the species.

== Distribution and habitat ==
The narrow-leaved mallee is found on sandplains and rises in an area between Lake Grace and Norseman in the eastern Wheatbelt and western Goldfields region, where it grows in sandy-clay-loam soils.

== Conservation status ==
This eucalypt is classified as "not threatened" by the Western Australian Government Department of Parks and Wildlife.

== See also ==
- List of Eucalyptus species
