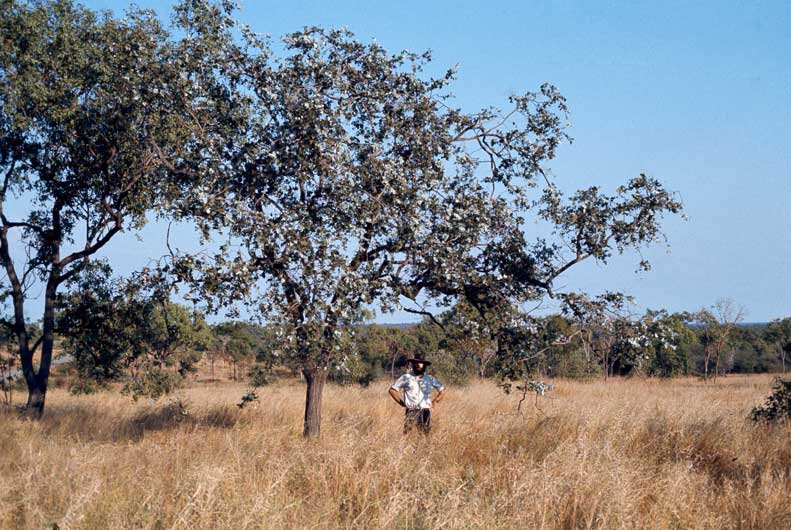
- Eucalyptus shirleyi near Charters Towers

Scientific classification
- Kingdom: Plantae
- Clade: Embryophytes
- Clade: Tracheophytes
- Clade: Spermatophytes
- Clade: Angiosperms
- Clade: Eudicots
- Clade: Rosids
- Order: Myrtales
- Family: Myrtaceae
- Genus: Eucalyptus
- Species: E. shirleyi

Binomial name
- Eucalyptus shirleyi Maiden

= Eucalyptus shirleyi =

Shirley's silver leafed ironbark

Species of eucalyptus

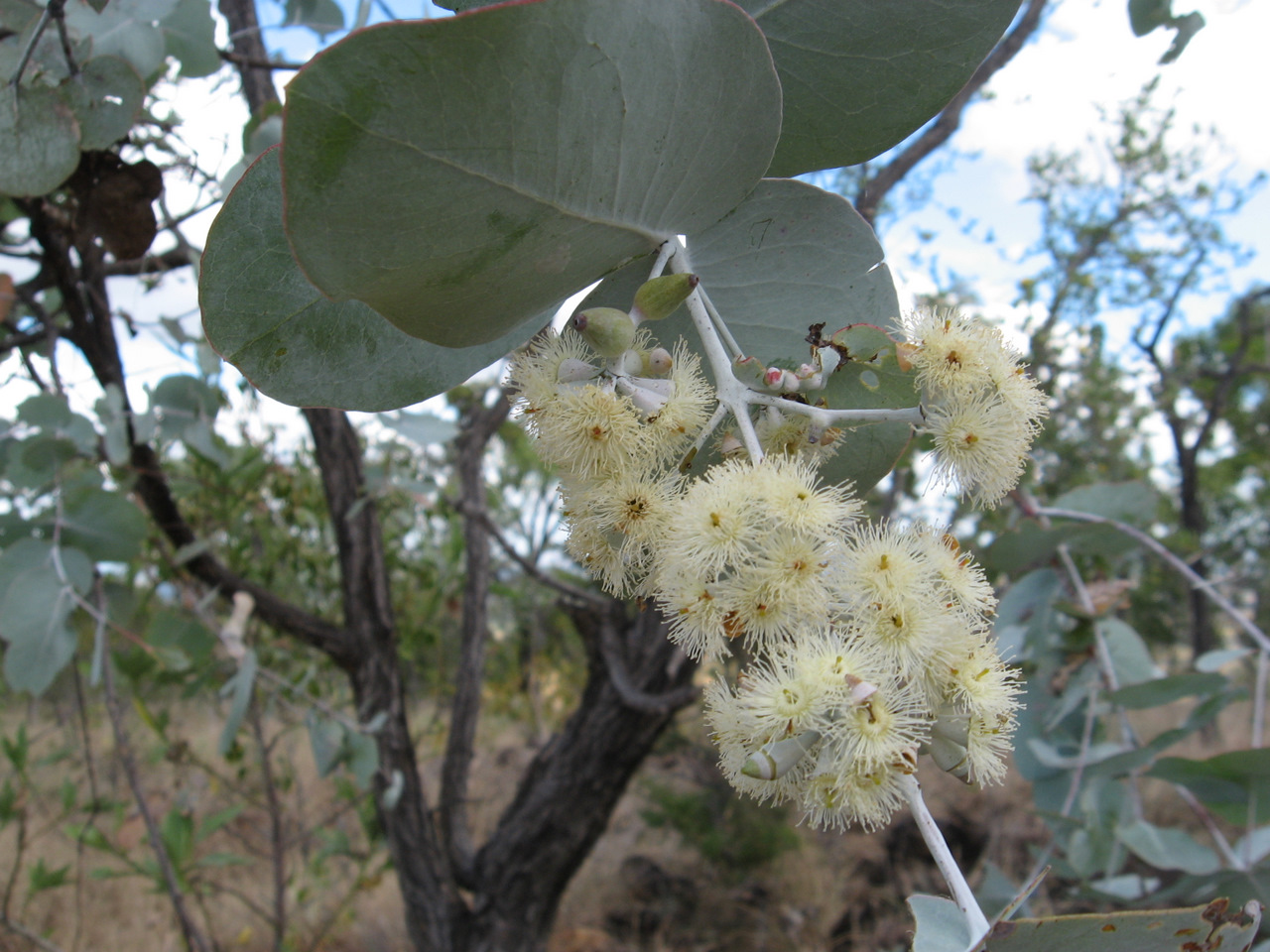
Flower buds and flowers

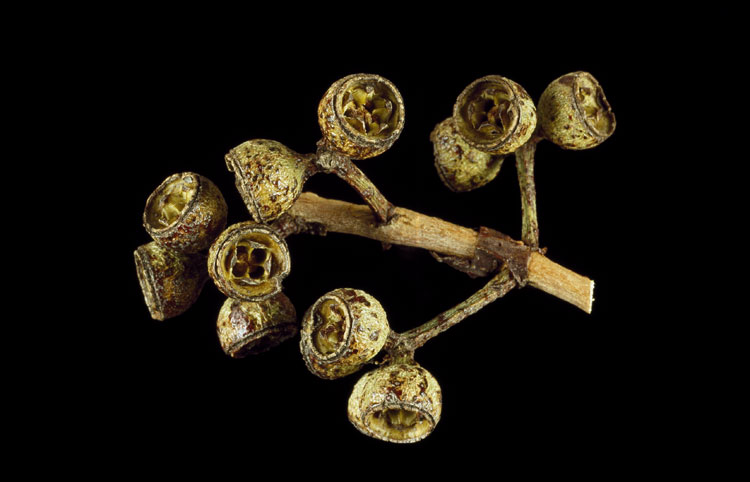
Fruit

Eucalyptus shirleyi, commonly known as Shirley's silver leafed ironbark, silver-leaved ironbark, or Shirley's silver leaved ironbark, is a species of small ironbark tree that is endemic to Queensland. It has rough ironbark on the trunk and larger branches, the thinnest branches glaucous, a crown composed of sessile, heart-shaped, egg-shaped or round juvenile leaves, flower buds in groups of seven, white flowers and cup-shaped to barrel-shaped fruit.

== Description ==
Eucalyptus shirleyi is small tree, often of mallee form and with a crooked trunk, that typically grows to a height of 4–7 m (13–23 ft) and forms a lignotuber. It has rough, dark grey to black, deeply fissured ironbark on the trunk and larger branches, usually glaucous branchlets. The crown of the tree is usually composed of juvenile leaves that are sessile, arranged in opposite pairs, heart-shaped to egg-shaped or round with their bases stem-clasping. The leaves are the same shade of dull bluish green on both sides, 50–130 mm (2.0–5.1 in) long and 30–80 mm (1.2–3.1 in) wide. The flower buds are arranged on the ends of branchlets in groups of seven on a branched peduncle 17–37 mm (0.67–1.46 in) long, the individual buds on pedicels 17–37 mm (0.67–1.46 in) long. Mature buds are oval, 8–10 mm (0.31–0.39 in) long and 4–6 mm (0.16–0.24 in) wide and glaucous, often ribbed with a conical to rounded operculum. Flowering occurs between March and May and the flowers are white or pale creamy yellow. The fruit is a woody cup-shaped to barrel-shaped capsule 6–10 mm (0.24–0.39 in) long, 5–10 mm (0.20–0.39 in) wide and usually ribbed with the valves near rim level or below.

== Taxonomy ==
Eucalyptus shirleyi was first formally described by the botanist Joseph Maiden in 1923 in his book A Critical Revision of the Genus Eucalyptus, from specimens collected from the Stannary Hills in North Queensland. The specific epithet honours John Shirley, an educationist and scientist, who also served on the council of the Royal Society of Queensland for 33 years and was twice its president.

== Distribution ==
Shirley's silver leafed ironbark is found in north and central Queensland from Mount Mulligan south through the Ravenshoe and Herberton areas to near St Lawrence. It grows in woodland and forest in a wide range of soils.

== Conservation status ==
This eucalyptus is classified as "least concern" under the Queensland Government Nature Conservation Act 1992.

== See also ==
- List of Eucalyptus species
