= Eucalyptus scopulorum =

Conservation status
- Near Threatened (IUCN 3.1)

- Critically endangered (EPBC Act)

Scientific classification
- Kingdom: Plantae
- Clade: Tracheophytes
- Clade: Angiosperms
- Clade: Eudicots
- Clade: Rosids
- Order: Myrtales
- Family: Myrtaceae
- Genus: Eucalyptus
- Species: E. scopulorum

Binomial name
- Eucalyptus scopulorum K.D.Hill

Species of eucalyptus

Eucalyptus scopulorum is a species of small tree that is endemic to a small area of northern New South Wales. It has rough ironbark on the trunk and branches, lance-shaped adult leaves, flower buds in groups of seven, white flowers and barrel-shaped or conical fruit.

== Description ==
Eucalyptus scopulorum is a tree that typically grows to a height of 8 m (26 ft) and forms a lignotuber. It has soft, corky, pale grey bark on the trunk and branches. Young plants and coppice regrowth have stems that are more or less square in cross-section and dull greyish green leaves that are egg-shaped, 35–110 mm (1.4–4.3 in) long and 25–50 mm (0.98–1.97 in) wide. Adult leaves are the same shade of dull green on both sides, lance-shaped to broadly lance-shaped, 60–110 mm (2.4–4.3 in) long and 15–38 mm (0.59–1.50 in) wide, tapering to a petiole 8–25 mm (0.31–0.98 in) long. The flower buds are arranged on the ends of branchlets in groups of seven on a branched peduncle 7–15 mm (0.28–0.59 in) long, the individual buds on pedicels 6–9 mm (0.24–0.35 in) long. Mature buds are oval to diamond-shaped, 7–9 mm (0.28–0.35 in) long and about 4 mm (0.16 in) wide with a conical operculum. Flowering has been recorded in October and the flowers are white. The fruit is a woody barrel-shaped or conical capsule 6–9 mm (0.24–0.35 in) long and 5–7 mm (0.20–0.28 in) wide with the valves below rim level.

== Taxonomy and naming ==
Eucalyptus scopulorum was first formally described in 1997 by Ken Hill in the journal Telopea from specimens he collected in the Gibraltar Range State Forest in 1996. The specific epithet (scopulorum) is from the Latin word scopulus meaning "a cliff", referring to the usual habitat of this species.

== Distribution and habitat ==
This eucalypt grows in rocky crevices on steep cliffs and is only known in a few places on the Gibraltar Range.

== Conservation status ==
As of March 2025, Eucalyptus scopulorum has been listed as "critically endangered" under the Australian Government Environment Protection and Biodiversity Conservation Act 1999. The IUCN Red List assesses the species as Near Threatened.
