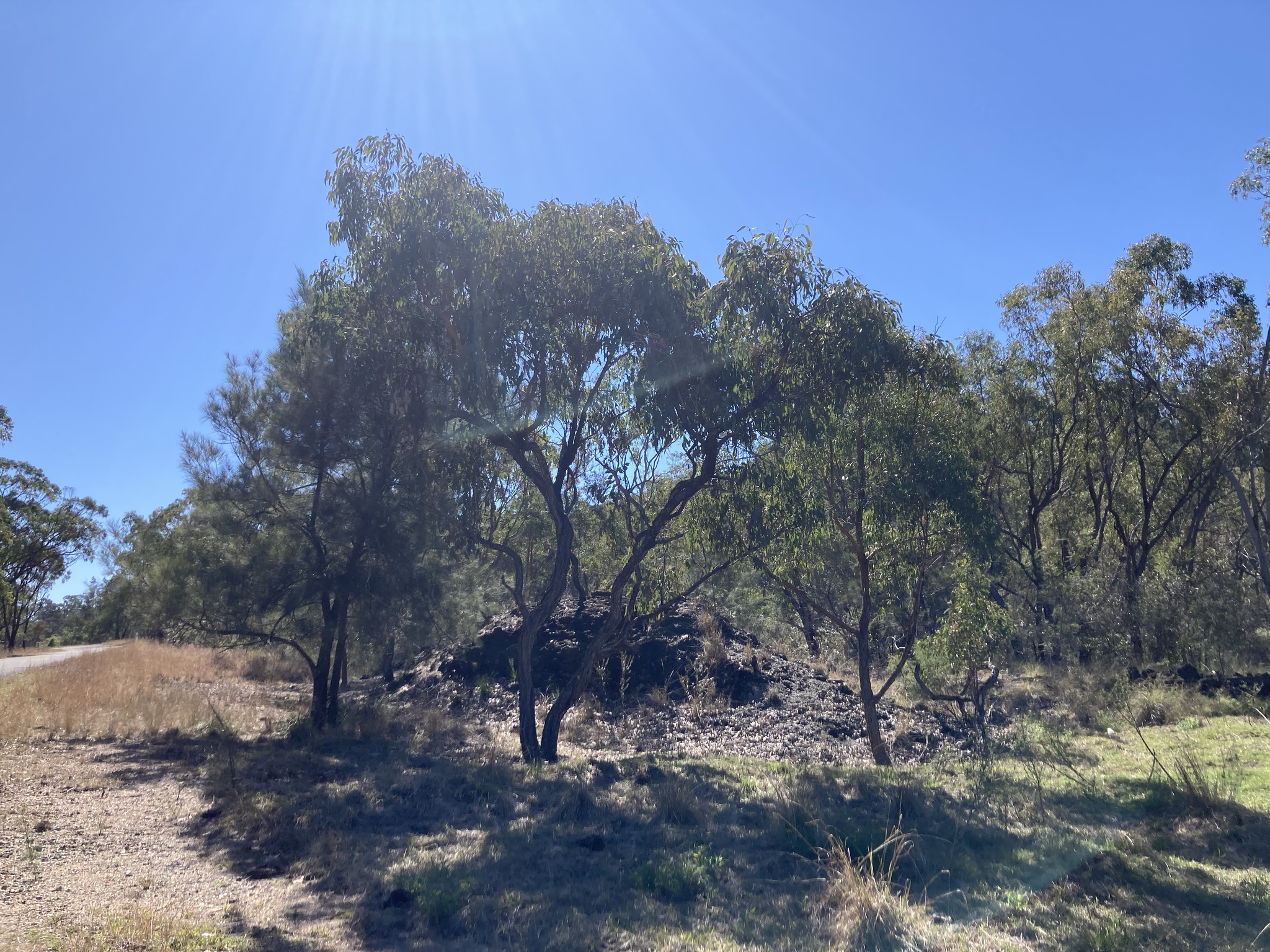

Scientific classification
- Kingdom: Plantae
- Clade: Tracheophytes
- Clade: Angiosperms
- Clade: Eudicots
- Clade: Rosids
- Order: Myrtales
- Family: Myrtaceae
- Genus: Eucalyptus
- Species: E. ophitica

Binomial name
- Eucalyptus ophitica L.A.S.Johnson & K.D.Hill

= Eucalyptus ophitica =

Serpentine ironbark

Species of eucalyptus

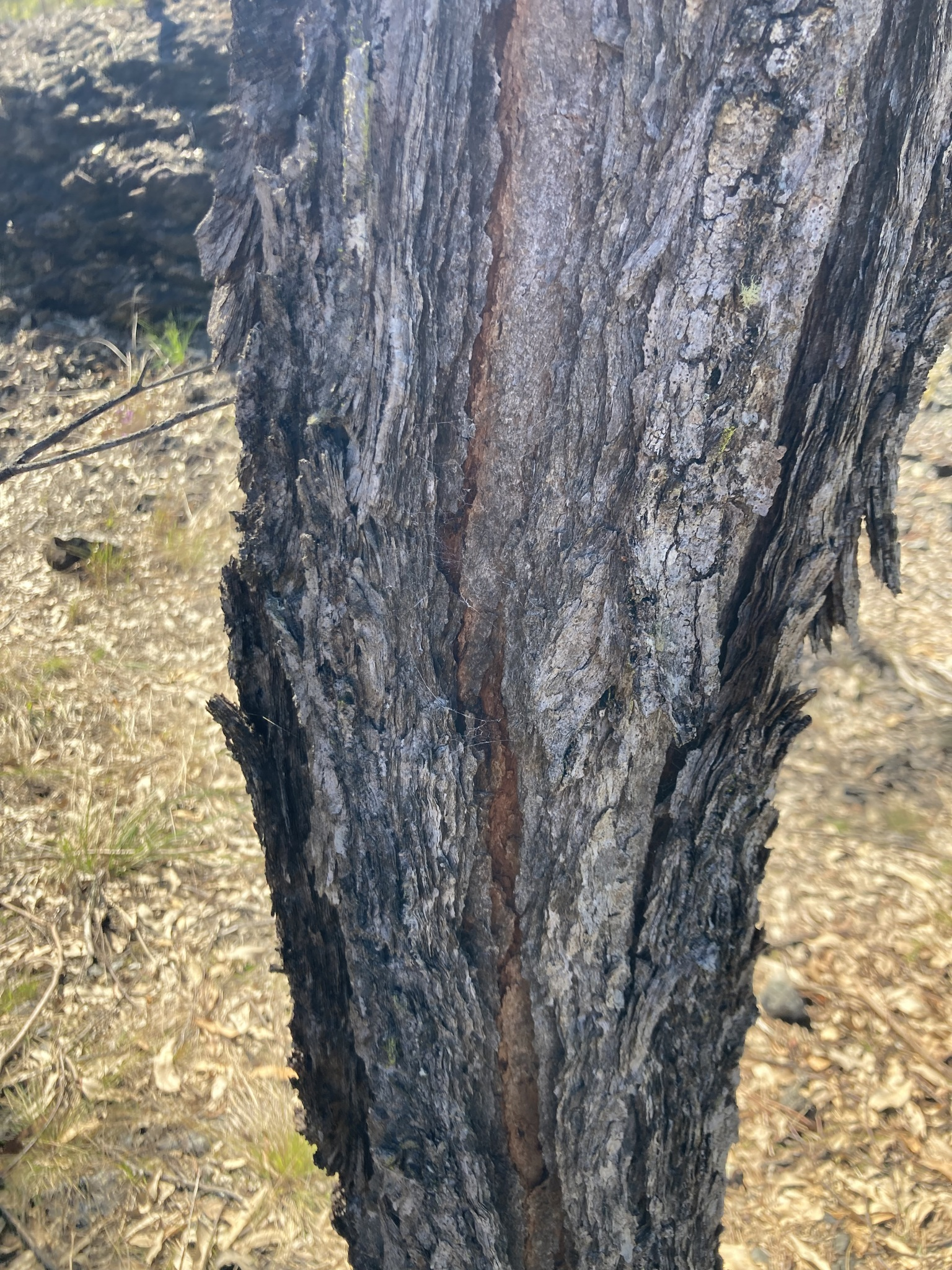
Bark

Eucalyptus ophitica, commonly known as the serpentine ironbark, is a species of small ironbark tree that is endemic to a small area of northern New South Wales. It has grey ironbark, lance-shaped adult leaves, flower buds in groups of seven, white flowers and cup-shaped, conical or hemispherical fruit.

== Description ==
Eucalyptus ophitica is a tree that typically grows to a height of 10–15 m (33–49 ft) and forms a lignotuber. Young plants and coppice regrowth have dull green, egg-shaped to lance-shaped leaves that are 75–20 mm (2.95–0.79 in) long and 30–70 mm (1.2–2.8 in) wide. Adult leaves are the same shade of green on both sides, lance-shaped, 78–170 mm (3.1–6.7 in) long and 17–25 mm (0.67–0.98 in) wide, tapering to a petiole 15–28 mm (0.59–1.10 in) long. The flower buds are arranged in leaf axils in groups of seven on a peduncle 4–10 mm (0.16–0.39 in) long, the individual buds on pedicels 3–8 mm (0.12–0.31 in) long. Mature buds are club-shaped to more or less cylindrical, 8–10 mm (0.31–0.39 in) long and 4–6 mm (0.16–0.24 in) wide with a rounded operculum. The flowers are white and the fruit is a woody, cup-shaped, conical or hemispherical capsule 4–6 mm (0.16–0.24 in) long and 5–7 mm (0.20–0.28 in) wide with the valves protruding above the rim.

== Taxonomy and naming ==
Eucalyptus ophitica was first formally described in 1990 by Lawrie Johnson and Ken Hill in the journal Telopea from specimens collected near Baryulgil in 1984. The specific epithet (ophitica) is from the Greek ophites, meaning "serpentine" (rock), referring to the rocks where the species is found.

== Distribution and habitat ==
Serpentine ironbark grows in grassy woodland on hilly serpentine outcrops in the Upper Clarence.
