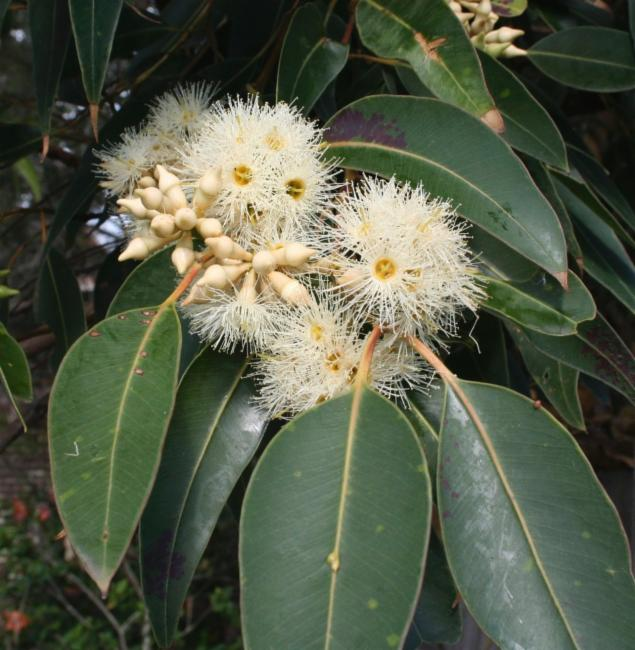
- Foliage, flower buds and flowers of Eucalyptus placita

Conservation status
- Data Deficient (IUCN 3.1)

Scientific classification
- Kingdom: Plantae
- Clade: Tracheophytes
- Clade: Angiosperms
- Clade: Eudicots
- Clade: Rosids
- Order: Myrtales
- Family: Myrtaceae
- Genus: Eucalyptus
- Species: E. placita

Binomial name
- Eucalyptus placita L.A.S.Johnson & K.D.Hill

= Eucalyptus placita =

Grey ironbark

Species of eucalyptus

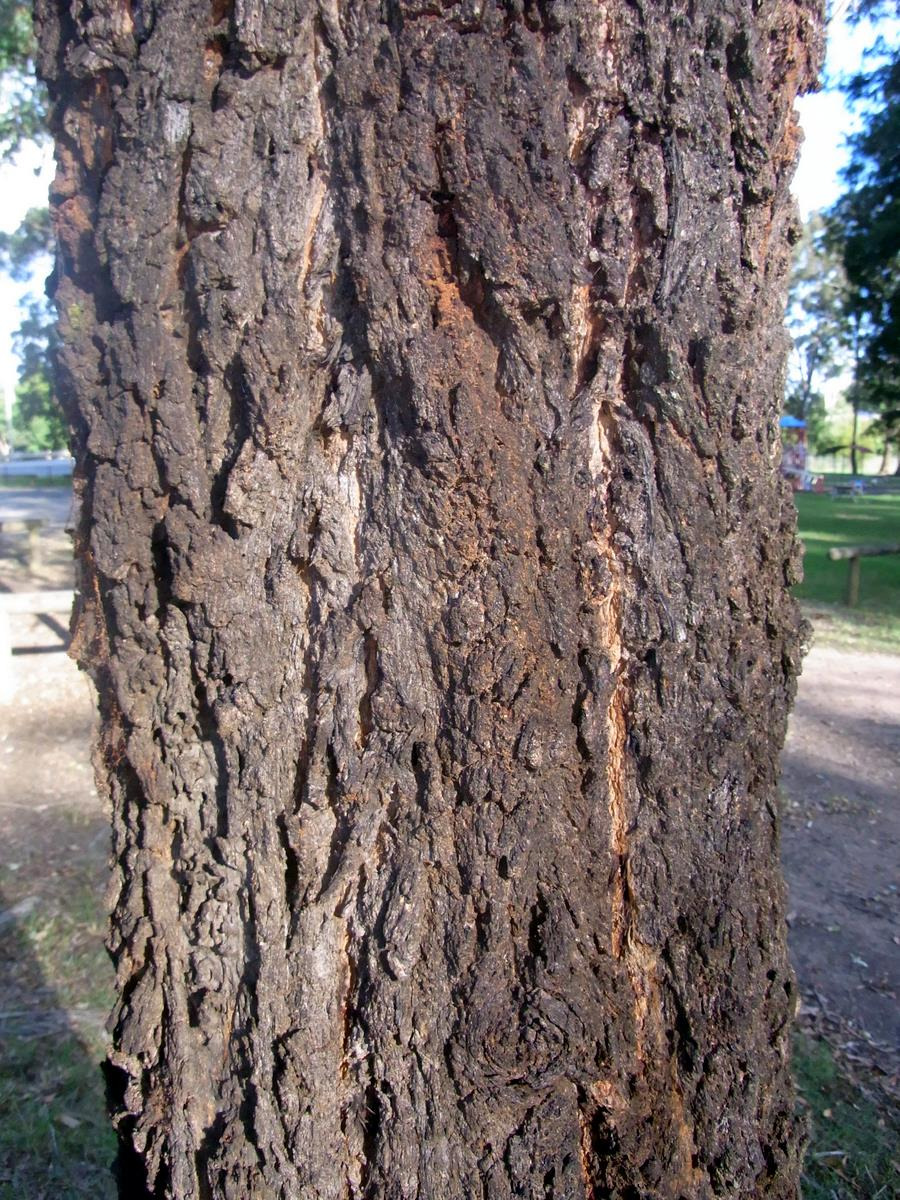
Bark

Eucalyptus placita, commonly known as grey ironbark or simply, ironbark, is a species of small to medium-sized tree that is endemic to New South Wales. It has rough, furrowed grey but soft ironbark on the trunk and branches, glossy green, lance-shaped adult leaves, flower buds in groups of seven, white flowers and conical fruit.

== Description ==
Eucalyptus placita is a tree that typically grows to a height of 25–30 m (82–98 ft) and forms a lignotuber. It has rough, furrowed grey bark that is unusually soft for an ironbark. Young plants and coppice regrowth have broadly egg-shaped leaves that are glossy bright green on the upper surface, paler below, 50–80 mm (2.0–3.1 in) long and 30–50 mm (1.2–2.0 in) wide and petiolate. Adult leaves are arranged alternately, glossy green on the upper surface, paler below, lance-shaped, 60–120 mm (2.4–4.7 in) long and 15–35 mm (0.59–1.38 in) wide on a petiole 10–20 mm (0.39–0.79 in) long. The flower buds are mostly arranged in groups of seven on a branched peduncle on the ends of branchlets, the peduncle 6–17 mm (0.24–0.67 in) long, the individual buds on pedicels 3–8 mm (0.12–0.31 in) long. Mature buds are oval to club-shaped or diamond-shaped, 6–7 mm (0.24–0.28 in) long and 3–4 mm (0.12–0.16 in) wide with a conical to beaked operculum. Flowering has been recorded in April, June, September and October and the flowers are white. The fruit is a woody, conical capsule 5–9 mm (0.20–0.35 in) long and 5–7 mm (0.20–0.28 in) wide with the valves below rim level.

== Taxonomy and naming ==
Eucalyptus placita was first formally described in 1990 by Lawrie Johnson and Ken Hill in the journal Telopea. The specific epithet (placita) is from the Latin placitus meaning "pleasing", referring to the colour of the leaves.

== Distribution and habitat ==
Grey ironbark grows in moist areas in the mid north coast region of New South Wales, from Cessnock to Kempsey.
