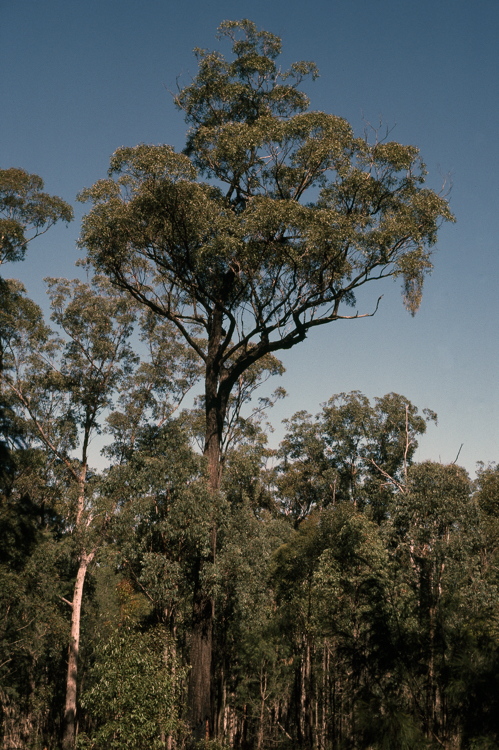

Conservation status
- Near Threatened (IUCN 3.1)

Scientific classification
- Kingdom: Plantae
- Clade: Tracheophytes
- Clade: Angiosperms
- Clade: Eudicots
- Clade: Rosids
- Order: Myrtales
- Family: Myrtaceae
- Genus: Eucalyptus
- Species: E. melanoleuca

Binomial name
- Eucalyptus melanoleuca S.T.Blake

= Eucalyptus melanoleuca =

Yarraman ironbark

Species of eucalyptus

Eucalyptus melanoleuca, commonly known as yarraman ironbark or nanango ironbark, is a species of tree that is endemic to south-east Queensland. It has rough ironbark on the trunk and larger branches, smooth bark above, lance-shaped adult leaves, flower buds in groups of seven, white flowers and barrel-shaped, to cup-shaped or conical fruit.

== Description ==
Eucalyptus melanoleuca is a tree that typically grows to a height of 30 m (98 ft) and forms a lignotuber. It has rough black bark on the trunk and larger branches, smooth white bark above. Young plants and coppice regrowth have egg-shaped leaves 45–85 mm (1.8–3.3 in) long and 20–40 mm (0.79–1.57 in) wide on a short petiole. Adult leaves are the same shade of glossy green on both sides, lance-shaped, 85–145 mm (3.3–5.7 in) long and 15–35 mm (0.59–1.38 in) wide, tapering to a petiole 12–20 mm (0.47–0.79 in) long. The flower buds are arranged in leaf axils and on the ends of branchlets on a branching peduncle, each branch with groups of seven buds. The peduncle is 5–15 mm (0.20–0.59 in) long with each bud on a pedicel 2–7 mm (0.079–0.276 in) long. Mature buds are oval to pear-shaped, 5–9 mm (0.20–0.35 in) long and 3–6 mm (0.12–0.24 in) wide with a conical operculum that is narrower and shorter that the floral cup. Flowering mainly occurs between June and September and the flowers are white. The fruit is a woody, barrel-shaped to cup-shaped or hemispherical capsule 4–7 mm (0.16–0.28 in) long and wide, with the valves below the level of the fruit.

== Taxonomy and naming ==
Eucalyptus melanoleuca was first formally described by Stanley Thatcher Blake in the journal Austrobaileya from a specimen he collected near Yarraman. The specific epithet (melanoleuca) refers to the strongly contrasted black and white trunk.

== Distribution and habitat ==
Yarraman ironbark grows in open forest and on the edges of rainforest between the Blackdown Tableland and Yarraman.

== Conservation status ==
This eucalypt is classed as "least concern" under the Queensland Government Nature Conservation Act 1992. The IUCN Red List assesses the species as Near Threatened.

== See also ==
- List of Eucalyptus species
