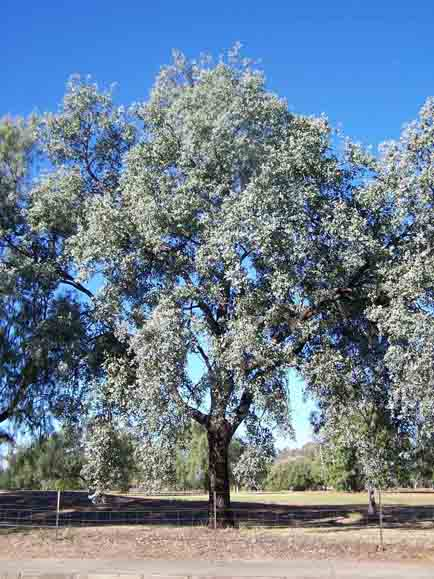

Scientific classification
- Kingdom: Plantae
- Clade: Embryophytes
- Clade: Tracheophytes
- Clade: Spermatophytes
- Clade: Angiosperms
- Clade: Eudicots
- Clade: Rosids
- Order: Myrtales
- Family: Myrtaceae
- Genus: Eucalyptus
- Species: E. melanophloia

Binomial name
- Eucalyptus melanophloia F.Muell.

= Eucalyptus melanophloia =

Silver-leaved ironbark

Species of eucalyptus

Eucalyptus melanophloia, commonly known as silver-leaved ironbark, is a species of tree that is endemic to northeastern Australia. It is a small to medium-sized tree with rough, hard ironbark on the trunk and branches. The crown is usually composed of juvenile leaves that are dull, glaucous, sessile and arranged in opposite pairs. The flower buds are arranged in groups of seven, the flowers white and the fruit cup-shaped to hemispherical.

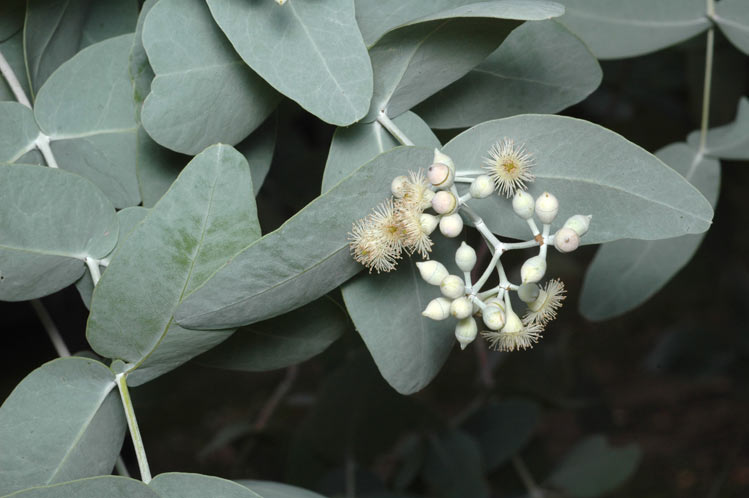
Flower buds

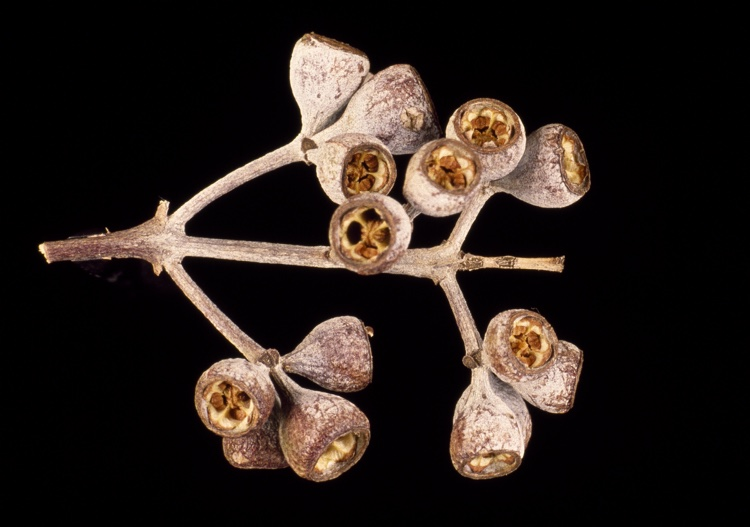
Fruit

== Description ==
Eucalyptus melanophloia is a tree, rarely a mallee, that typically grows to a height of 20–25 m (66–82 ft) and forms a lignotuber. It has hard, rough, dark grey to black bark on the trunk and branches. Young plants and coppice regrowth have leaves that are usually glaucous, arranged in opposite pairs, sessile, round to egg-shaped or heart-shaped, 20–100 mm (0.79–3.94 in) long and 13–100 mm (0.51–3.94 in) wide. The crown leaves are usually mostly juvenile leaves that are arranged in opposite pairs, sessile, the same dull glaucous colour on both sides, egg-shaped to heart-shaped or lance-shaped, 35–90 mm (1.4–3.5 in) long and 20–50 mm (0.79–1.97 in) wide. The flower buds are arranged on the ends of the branchlets in groups of seven on a branching peduncle 5–15 mm (0.20–0.59 in) long. The individual buds are on pedicels 2–9 mm (0.079–0.354 in) long. Mature buds are oval to diamond-shaped, 5–6 mm (0.20–0.24 in) long and 3–4 mm (0.12–0.16 in) wide with a conical operculum. Flowering has been recorded in January and February, and from June to August. The flowers are white and the fruit is a woody, cup-shaped to hemispherical capsule 3–8 mm (0.12–0.31 in) long and wide with the valves near or below rim level.

== Taxonomy and naming ==
Eucalyptus melanophloia was first formally described in 1859 by Ferdinand von Mueller and the description was published in the Journal of the Proceedings of the Linnean Society, Botany. The specific epithet is derived from the ancient Greek words melas, genitive melanos (μέλας, genitive μέλανος), meaning "black" and phloios (φλοιός) meaning "bark".

== Distribution and habitat ==
The silver-leaved ironbark grows in woodland on plains and tablelands in the eastern half of Queensland south from Mareeba, on the western side of the Great Dividing Range in New South Wales north from Dubbo and in a few isolated locations in the Northern Territory.

== Conservation status ==
This eucalypt is classified as "least concern" under the Queensland Government Nature Conservation Act 1992.

== Gallery ==
Eucalyptus images

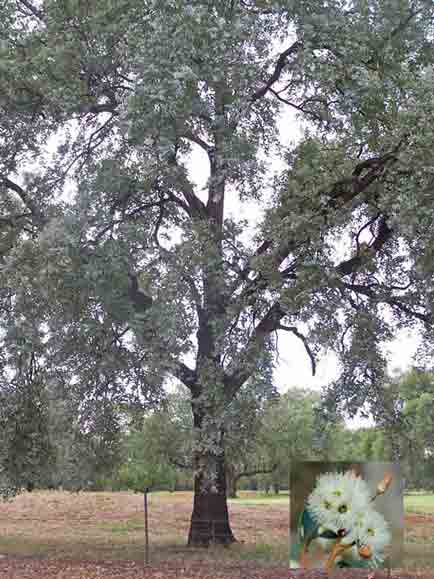
Tree

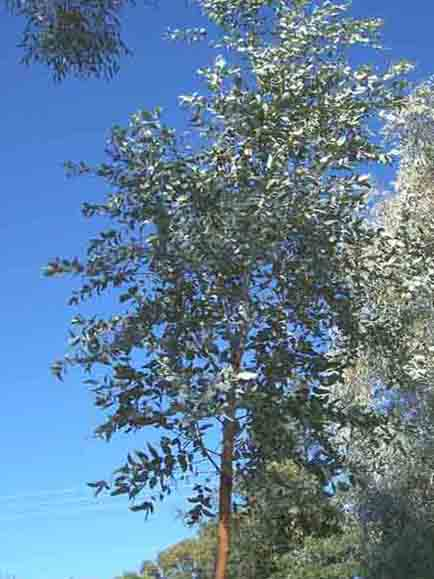
Tree

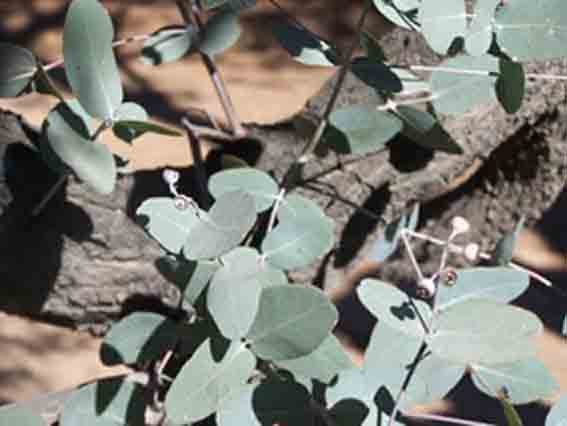
Leaves

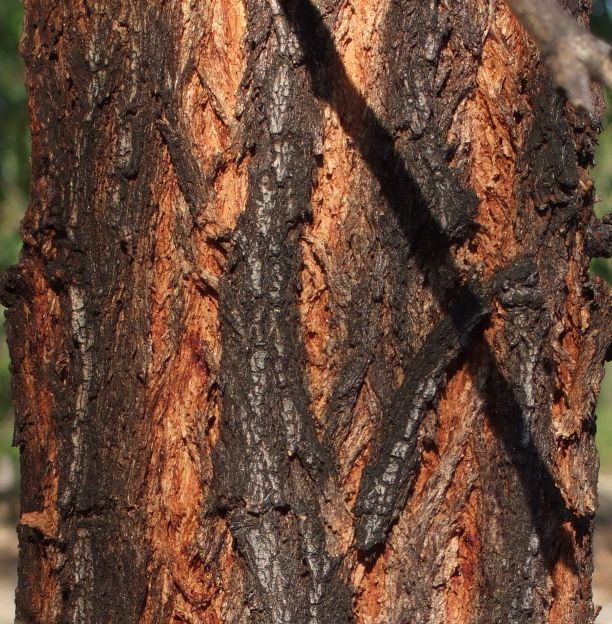
Bark

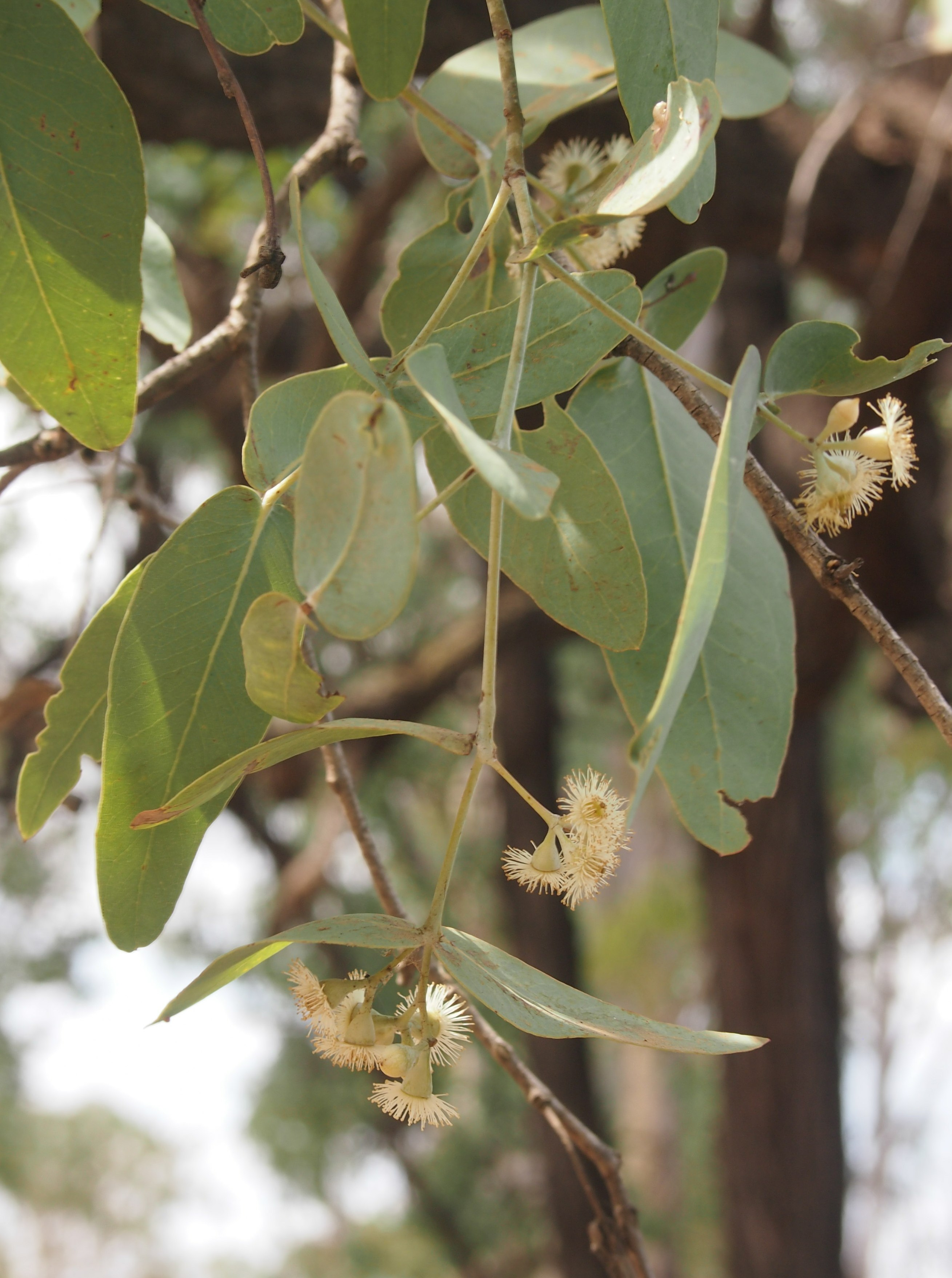
Foliage and flowers
