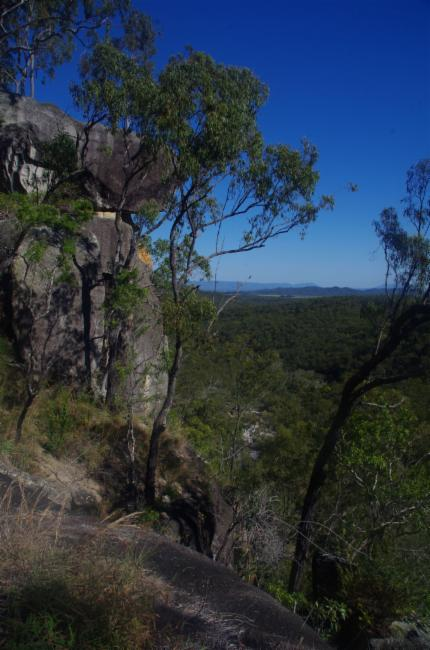
- Eucalyptus granitica in Davies Creek National Park

Scientific classification
- Kingdom: Plantae
- Clade: Embryophytes
- Clade: Tracheophytes
- Clade: Angiosperms
- Clade: Eudicots
- Clade: Rosids
- Order: Myrtales
- Family: Myrtaceae
- Genus: Eucalyptus
- Species: E. granitica

Binomial name
- Eucalyptus granitica L.A.S.Johnson & K.D.Hill

= Eucalyptus granitica =

Granite ironbark

Species of eucalyptus

Eucalyptus granitica, commonly known as the granite ironbark, is a species of tree that is endemic to Queensland. It has dark grey or black "ironbark" on the trunk and branches, glossy green, lance-shaped to curved adult leaves, flower buds in groups of seven, white flowers and cup-shaped to barrel-shaped fruit.

== Description ==
Eucalyptus granitica is a tree that typically grows to a height of 20 m (66 ft) and forms a lignotuber. It has hard or soft, dark grey to black ironbark on the trunk and branches. Young plants and coppice regrowth have stems that are more or less square in cross-section and leaves that are more or less sessile, lance-shaped, 60–110 mm (2.4–4.3 in) long and 1–20 mm (0.039–0.787 in) wide. Adult leaves are lance-shaped, more or less the same glossy green on both sides, 70–150 mm (2.8–5.9 in) long and 13–32 mm (0.51–1.26 in) wide on a petiole 10–20 mm (0.39–0.79 in) long. The flower buds are usually arranged in groups of seven on a branched peduncle, 3–11 mm (0.12–0.43 in) long, the individual buds on pedicels 2–4 mm (0.079–0.157 in) long. Mature buds are oval, 4–6 mm (0.16–0.24 in) long and about 3 mm (0.12 in) wide with a conical to rounded operculum. Flowering has mostly been recorded between July and September and the flowers are white. The fruit is a woody cup-shaped or barrel-shaped capsule 4–6 mm (0.16–0.24 in) long and 3–6 mm (0.12–0.24 in) wide with the valves near or below rim level.

== Taxonomy and naming ==
Eucalyptus granitica was first formally described in 1991 by Ken Hill and Lawrie Johnson from a specimen collected near Atherton on the road to Herberton. The description was published in the journal Telopea. The specific epithet is derived from the neo-Latin word graniticus, relating to granite, referring to the usual habitat of this species.

== Distribution and habitat ==
Granite ironbark is common on undulating country, growing in granite and volcanic soils from the Atherton Tableland to Paluma.

== Conservation status ==
This eucalypt is classified as "least concern" under the Queensland Government Nature Conservation Act 1992.

== See also ==
- List of Eucalyptus species
