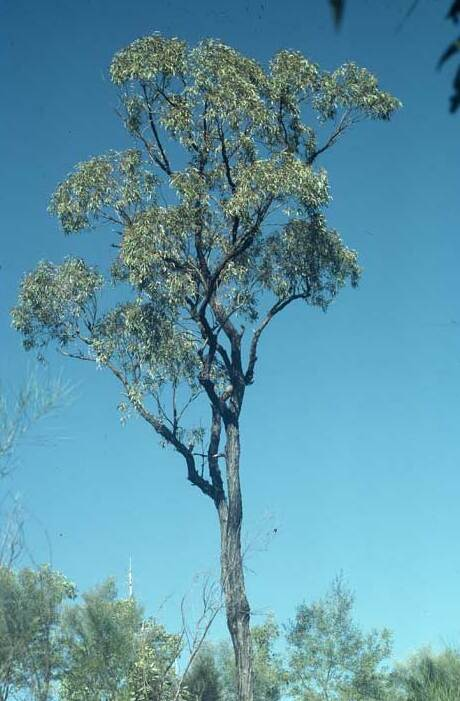

Scientific classification
- Kingdom: Plantae
- Clade: Tracheophytes
- Clade: Angiosperms
- Clade: Eudicots
- Clade: Rosids
- Order: Myrtales
- Family: Myrtaceae
- Genus: Eucalyptus
- Species: E. suffulgens

Binomial name
- Eucalyptus suffulgens L.A.S.Johnson & K.D.Hill

= Eucalyptus suffulgens =

Species of eucalyptus

Eucalyptus suffulgens is a small to medium-sized tree that is endemic to Queensland. It has hard ironbark on the trunk and larger branches, smooth bark above, lance-shaped adult leaves, flower buds in groups of seven on the ends of branchlets, white flowers and barrel-shaped fruit.

== Description ==
Eucalyptus suffulgens is a tree that typically grows to a height of 25 m (82 ft) and forms a lignotuber. It has dark grey to black ironbark on the trunk and larger branches, the thinner branches often with smooth bark. Young plants and coppice regrowth have glossy green, lance-shaped leaves that are 70–130 mm (2.8–5.1 in) long and 6–25 mm (0.24–0.98 in) wide. Adult leaves are the same shade of glossy green on both sides, lance-shaped, 80–160 mm (3.1–6.3 in) long and 15–25 mm (0.59–0.98 in) wide tapering to a petiole 8–20 mm (0.31–0.79 in) long. The flower buds are arranged on the ends of branchlets in groups of seven on a branched peduncle 10–20 mm (0.39–0.79 in) long, the individual buds on pedicels 3–10 mm (0.12–0.39 in) long. Mature buds are oval to pear-shaped, 7–10 mm (0.28–0.39 in) long and 4–5 mm (0.16–0.20 in) wide with a conical operculum that is shorter and narrower than the floral cup. Flowering occurs from April to September and the flowers are white. The fruit is a woody, barrel-shaped capsule 7–13 mm (0.28–0.51 in) long and 5–10 mm (0.20–0.39 in) wide with the valves below rim level.

== Taxonomy and naming ==
Eucalyptus suffulgens was first formally described in 1991 by Ken Hill and Lawrie Johnson in the journal Telopea from specimens collected by Johnson near Biloela in 1971. The specific epithet (suffulgens) is from the Latin sub- meaning "somewhat" and fulgens meaning "shining", referring to the leaves of the species.

== Distribution and habitat ==
This ironbark is locally abundant on shallow soil over sandstone on ranges and escarpments in the central ranges of Queensland, including the Blackdown Tableland.

== Conservation stutus ==
This eucalypt is classified as "least concern" under the Queensland Government Nature Conservation Act 1992.

== See also ==
- List of Eucalyptus species
