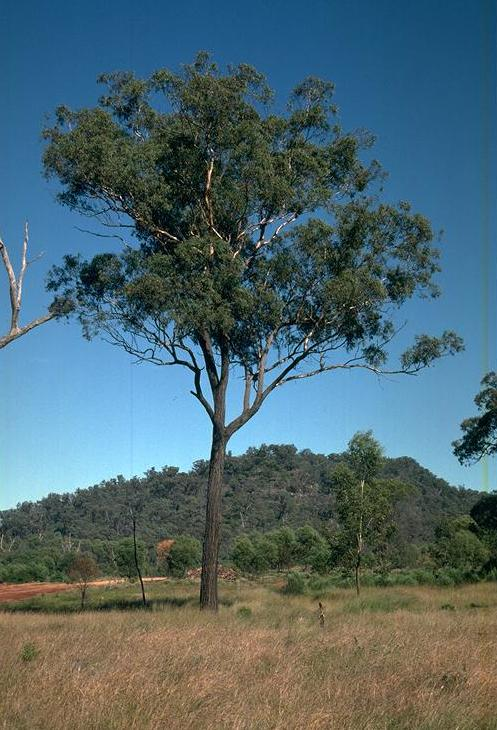
- Eucalyptus decorticans near Cracow

Scientific classification
- Kingdom: Plantae
- Clade: Tracheophytes
- Clade: Angiosperms
- Clade: Eudicots
- Clade: Rosids
- Order: Myrtales
- Family: Myrtaceae
- Genus: Eucalyptus
- Species: E. decorticans

Binomial name
- Eucalyptus decorticans (F.M.Bailey) Maiden

= Eucalyptus decorticans =

Gum-top ironbark

Species of eucalyptus

Eucalyptus decorticans, commonly known as the gum-top ironbark, is a species of tree that is endemic to Queensland. It has rough, dark grey or black "ironbark" on the trunk and larger branches, smooth white bark on the thinner branches, lance-shaped to curved adult leaves, flower buds in groups of seven, white flowers and conical, cup-shaped or barrel-shaped fruit.

== Description ==
Eucalyptus deccorticans is a tree that typically grows to a height of 40 m (130 ft) and forms a lignotuber. It has hard, dark grey to black ironbark on the trunk and larger branches, smooth white to greyish or yellow bark on the thinner branches. Young plants and coppice regrowth have leaves that are narrow lance-shaped, a lighter colour on the lower surface, 50–90 mm (2.0–3.5 in) long and 5–15 mm (0.20–0.59 in) wide. Adult leaves are lance-shaped to curved, the same dull colour on both sides, 55–125 mm (2.2–4.9 in) long and 10–30 mm (0.39–1.18 in) wide on a petiole 10–25 mm (0.39–0.98 in) long. The flower buds are arranged in leaf axils in groups of seven on a peduncle 5–15 mm (0.20–0.59 in) long, the individual buds on a pedicel 2–6 mm (0.079–0.236 in) long. The buds are club-shaped to spindle-shaped or diamond-shaped, 6–7 mm (0.24–0.28 in) long and 3–4 mm (0.12–0.16 in) wide with a conical operculum. Flowering has been observed in April, August and September and the flowers are white. The fruit is a woody conical, cup-shaped or barrel-shaped capsule 7–9 mm (0.28–0.35 in) long and 5–6 mm (0.20–0.24 in) wide on a pedicel 2–7 mm (0.079–0.276 in) long.

== Taxonomy and naming ==
Gum-top ironbark was first formally described in 1911 by Frederick Manson Bailey from a specimen collected near Eidsvold by Thomas Lane Bancroft. Bailey gave it the name Eucalyptus siderophloia f. decorticans and published the description in the Queensland Agricultural Journal. In 1921, Joseph Maiden raised the form to species level as Eucalyptus decorticans, publishing the change in his book A Critical Revision of the Genus Eucalyptus. The specific epithet (decorticans) is derived from the Latin word decorticans meaning "without bark" referring to the peeling bark on the smaller branches.

== Distribution and habitat ==
Eucalyptus decorticans grows in open forest on hills and hillsides in stony clay soils. It is widespread in southeastern Queensland.

== Conservation status ==
This eucalypt is classified as "least concern" under the Queensland Government Nature Conservation Act 1992.

== See also ==
- List of Eucalyptus species
