= Eucalyptus sicilifolia =

Scientific classification
- Kingdom: Plantae
- Clade: Tracheophytes
- Clade: Angiosperms
- Clade: Eudicots
- Clade: Rosids
- Order: Myrtales
- Family: Myrtaceae
- Genus: Eucalyptus
- Species: E. sicilifolia

Binomial name
- Eucalyptus sicilifolia L.A.S.Johnson & K.D.Hill

Species of eucalyptus

Eucalyptus sicilifolia is a species of small ironbark tree that is endemic to Queensland. It has dark ironbark on the trunk and branches, narrow lance-shaped to curved adult leaves, flower buds in groups of seven, white flowers and cup-shaped to barrel-shaped fruit.

== Description ==
Eucalyptus sicilifolia is a tree that typically grows to a height of 10 m (33 ft) and forms a lignotuber. It has rough, dark grey to black ironbark on the trunk and branches. Young plants and coppice regrowth have stems that are square in cross-section and lance-shaped leaves that are 60–135 mm (2.4–5.3 in) long and 9–35 mm (0.35–1.38 in) wide. Adult leaves are the same shade of glossy green on both sides, narrow lance-shaped to curved, 65–120 mm (2.6–4.7 in) long and 7–16 mm (0.28–0.63 in) wide, with the base tapering to a petiole 7–17 mm (0.28–0.67 in) long. The flower buds are arranged on the ends of the branchlets and in leaf axils on a peduncle 4–8 mm (0.16–0.31 in) long, the individual buds on pedicels 2–4 mm (0.079–0.157 in) long. Mature buds are oval, 5–6 mm (0.20–0.24 in) long and 3–4 mm (0.12–0.16 in) wide with a conical to rounded operculum. Flowering occurs from July to October and the flowers are white. The fruit is a woody cup-shaped to barrel-shaped capsule 4–7 mm (0.16–0.28 in) long and 4–6 mm (0.16–0.24 in) wide with the valved near rim level.

== Taxonomy and naming ==
Eucalyptus sicilifolia was first formally described in 1991 by Lawrie Johnson and Ken Hill in the journal Telopea, from specimens collected on Little St Peter Hill, near Springsure. The specific epithet (sicilifolia) is from the Latin sicilis meaning a "sickle" and folium meaning a "leaf", referring to the curved leaves.

== Distribution and habitat ==
This eucalypt has a restricted distribution near the type location where it grows in low woodland in rocky places.

== Conservation status ==
This eucalyptus is classified as "vulnerable" under the Queensland Government Nature Conservation Act 1992.

== See also ==
- List of Eucalyptus species
