= Ian Brooker =

Australian botanist (1934–2016)

- Born: June 2, 1934
- Died: June 25, 2016 (aged 82)
- Education: Australian National University

Murray Ian Hill Brooker AM (2 June 1934 – 25 June 2016), better known as Ian Brooker, was an Australian botanist. He was widely recognised as the leading authority on the genus Eucalyptus.

Ian Brooker was born in Adelaide, South Australia on 2 June 1934. He obtained a B.Ag.Sc. from the University of Adelaide, and a MSc and D.Sc. from the Australian National University in Canberra. He worked with the Soil Conservation Branch of the Department of Agriculture in South Australia from 1957 to 1963; then joined the Department of Botany at the Australian National University until 1969; and then spent a year with the Western Australian Herbarium.

In 1970, Brooker joined the Forest Research Institute in Canberra, now part of CSIRO. His research since then has specialised in the genus Eucalyptus, especially its taxonomy. He travelled widely throughout Australia collecting specimens, and published 100 research papers, 180 leaflets, and four books, and is the principal author of "Forest Trees of Australia".

In his role as a eucalypt specialist, he travelled widely in the world, including the US, Brazil, most European countries, southern and eastern Africa, Morocco, Israel, India, China, and New Zealand. In 1980/1981 he was appointed Australian Botanical Liaison Officer at Kew in the UK.

In 2006, he was made a Member of the Order of Australia.
