= West Indian lemon grass =

West Indian lemon grass may refer to:

- Cymbopogon citratus, native to Maritime Southeast Asia
- Cymbopogon schoenanthus, native to southern Asia and northern Africa
