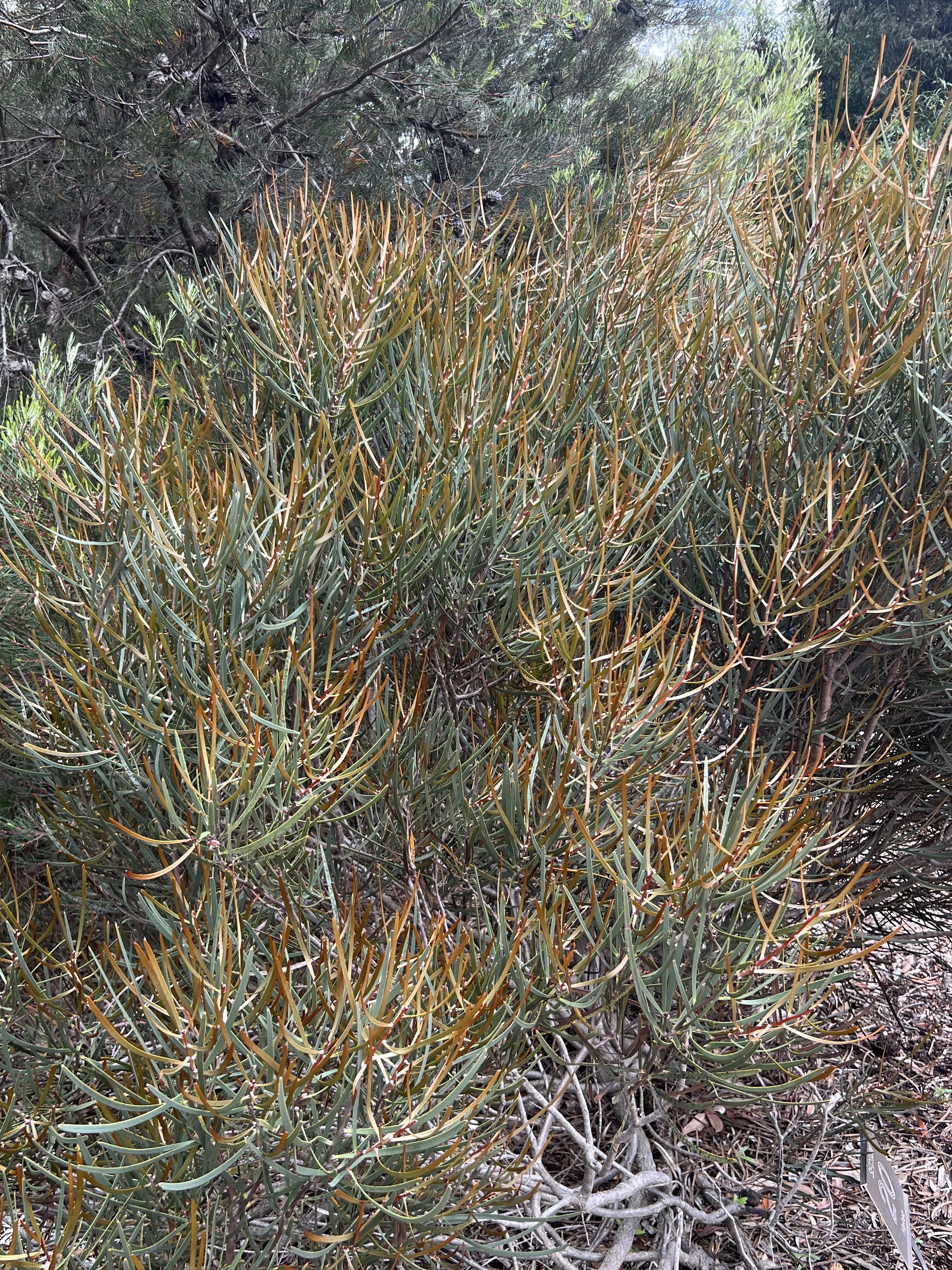

Conservation status
- Critically Endangered (IUCN 3.1)

Scientific classification
- Kingdom: Plantae
- Clade: Tracheophytes
- Clade: Angiosperms
- Clade: Eudicots
- Order: Proteales
- Family: Proteaceae
- Genus: Hakea
- Species: H. aenigma

Binomial name
- Hakea aenigma W.R.Barker & Haegi.
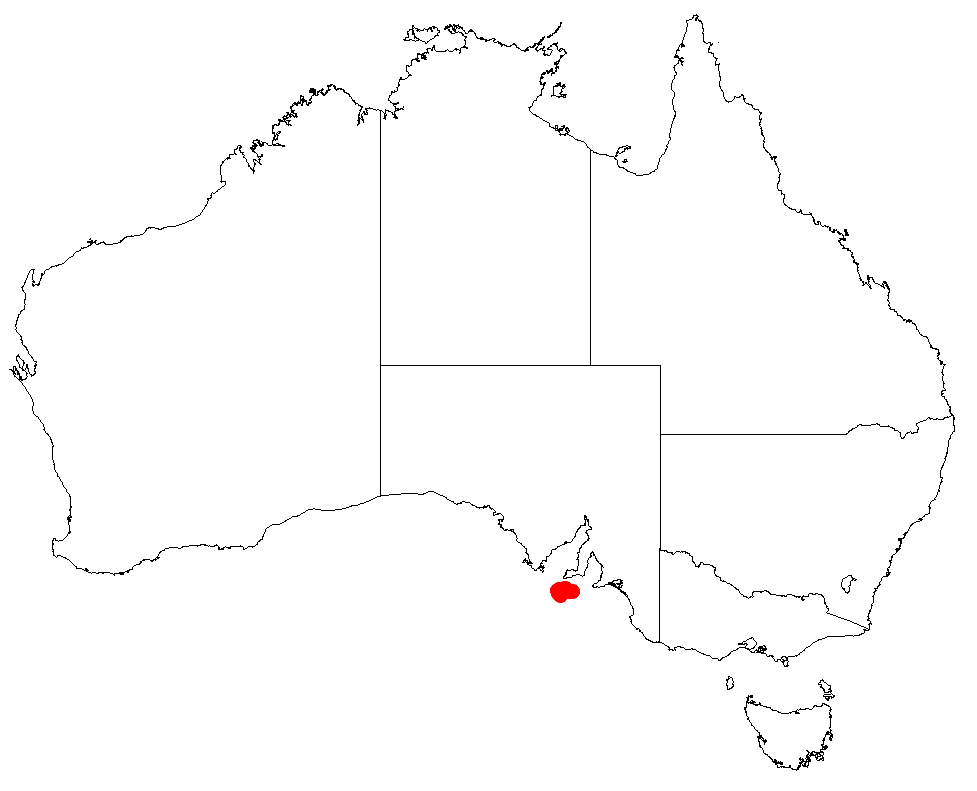
- Occurrence data from Australasian Virtual Herbarium

= Hakea aenigma =

Enigma hakea

Species of shrub native to South Australia

Hakea aenigma, commonly known as the enigma hakea, is a critically endangered shrub in the family Proteaceae endemic to Kangaroo Island in South Australia. It is one of two Hakea species totally reliant on suckering to reproduce therefore having "reached evolutionary dead-ends" as this method of reproduction greatly limits genetic variation. The entire population of this species may be of clonal colonies descended from a single individual.

== Description ==
Hakea aenigma is a rounded bushy shrub 1.5 to 2.5 metres (4.9 to 8.2 ft) high. Smaller branches are densely covered with flattened fine hairs, thinning nearer flowering time. The glabrescent leaves are flat and linear 5 to 35 centimetres (2 to 14 in) long and 3 to 10 millimetres (0.1 to 0.4 in) wide with prominent longitudinal veins 1–7 above and 4–9 on the underside. Each inflorescence has 16–33 flowers growing on an individual stalk. Pedicels and perianth are cream-white and smooth. The style is 4.5–7.2 mm (0.2–0.3 in) long. Flowers are sterile so no fruit is produced and plants can only reproduce vegetatively by suckering roots. Hakea pulvinifera is the only other species in the genus reliant on this method for reproduction. Hakea aenigma has cream-white blooms throughout spring from September to November.

== Taxonomy and naming ==
Hakea aenigma was first formally described by the botanists Laurence Arnold Haegi and William Robert Barker in 1985 and the description was published in the Journal of the Adelaide Botanic Gardens. The specific epithet is taken from the Latin word aenigma meaning "riddle", "something obscure" or "inexplicable" referring to the puzzlement of finding no fruit for the plant and the uncertainty of its origins.

== Distribution ==
This species is endemic to a small area on the western end of Kangaroo Island in South Australia. It is confined to the more elevated parts of the lateritic plateau system, up to 100 metres above sea level and is part of the dense mallee-heath that grows in clay-loam to sandy soils.

== Conservation status ==
Hakea aenigma is listed as "Critically endangered" on the IUCN Red List of Threatened Species due to the possibility of the entire population consisting of clonal colonies descended from a single individual. This results in little to no genetic variation which makes it more vulnerable to threats such as pathogens, climate change and possible increase in fire regimes.
