= Cymbopogon schoenanthus subsp. proximus =

Scientific classification
- Kingdom: Plantae
- Clade: Tracheophytes
- Clade: Angiosperms
- Clade: Monocots
- Clade: Commelinids
- Order: Poales
- Family: Poaceae
- Subfamily: Panicoideae
- Genus: Cymbopogon
- Species: C. schoenanthus
- Subspecies: C. s. subsp. proximus

Trinomial name
- Cymbopogon schoenanthus subsp. proximus (Hochst. ex A.Rich.) Maire & Weiller

Synonyms
- List: Andropogon jwarancusa var. proximus (Hochst. ex A.Rich.) Hack.; Andropogon proximus Hochst. ex A.Rich.; Andropogon schoenanthus var. proximus (Hochst. ex A.Rich.) A.Chev.; Andropogon schoenanthus subsp. proximus (Hochst. ex A.Rich.) Maire; Cymbopogon proximus (Hochst. ex A.Rich.) Chiov.; Cymbopogon sennarensis var. proximus (Hochst. ex A.Rich.) Chiov.; Gymnanthelia proxima (Hochst. ex A.Rich.) Andersson; Andropogon giganteus Fenzl ex Steud., pro syn.; Andropogon jwarancusa var. sennarensis (Hochst.) Hack.; Andropogon sennarensis Hochst.; Cymbopogon proximus var. sennarensis (Hochst.) Drar; Cymbopogon sennarensis (Hochst.) Chiov.; Gymnanthelia sennarensis (Hochst.) Schweinf. & Asch.

Subspecies of grass

Cymbopogon schoenanthus subsp. proximus is a member of the genus Cymbopogon (lemongrasses) in the grass family (Poaceae).
