= Pelargonium 'citrosum' =

Flowering plant cultivar

Pelargonium 'citrosum' (often sold by the invalid binomial name Pelargonium citrosum) is a perennial subshrub with fragrant leaves that are reminiscent of citronella.

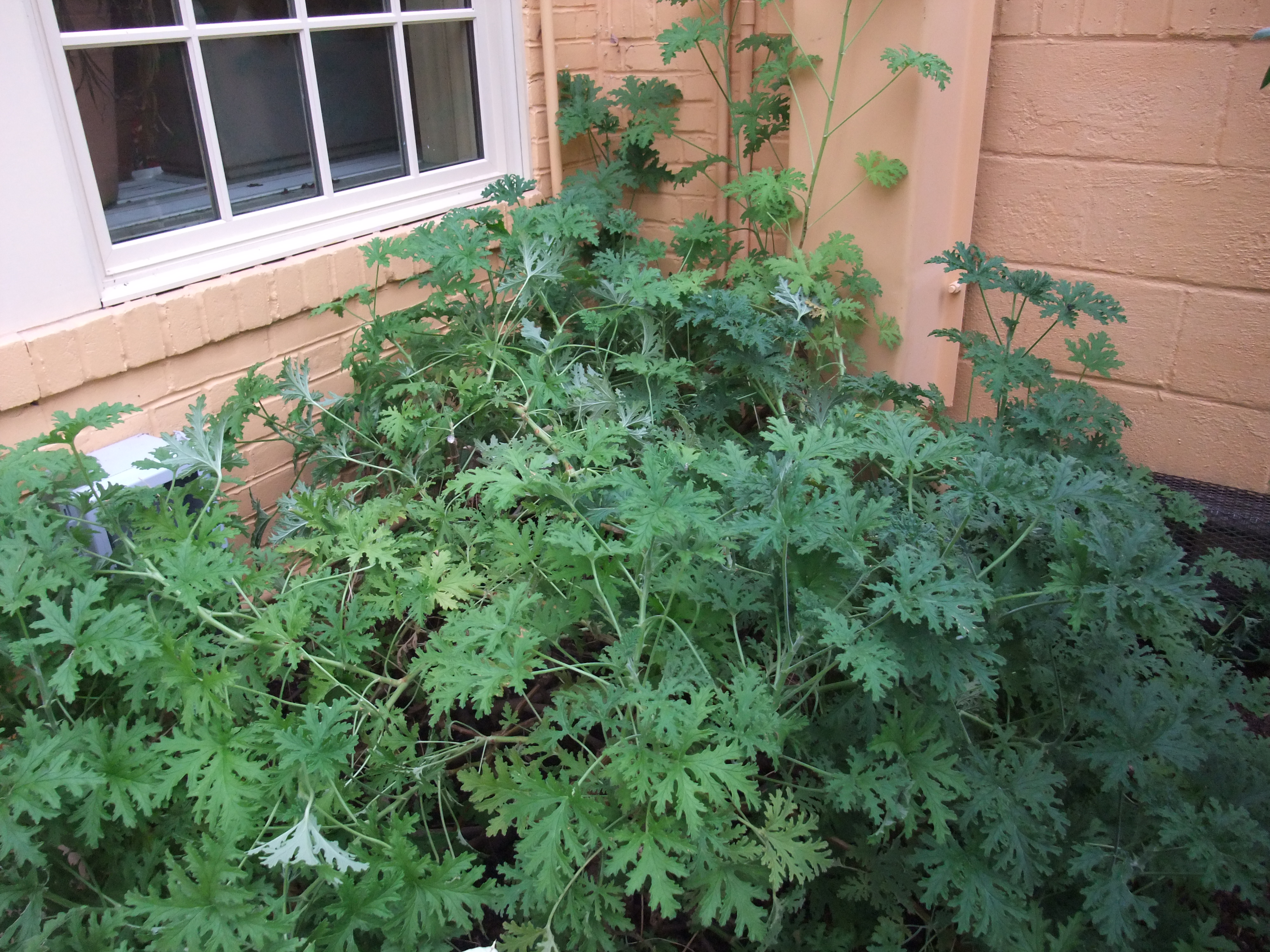
Pelargonium 'citrosum'

P. 'citrosum' is marketed as "mosquito plant" or "citrosa geranium" in stores in the United States and Canada, even though research from the University of Guelph indicates the plant is ineffective against Aedes aegypti mosquitos. "Not only was the plant ineffective at protecting humans against Aedes mosquito bites, the mosquitoes were seen landing and resting on the citrosa plant on a regular basis."

It is claimed that P. 'citrosum' may be a genetic bonding of the African geranium with genes from Cymbopogon grass, but that claim has also been proven false. The plant appears to be a cultivar of Pelargonium graveolens.

The citronella geranium is not to be confused with others that are also called "mosquito plant", nor with the group of plants also known as citronella grass, or with Citronella mucronata (Chilean Citronella).

Pelargonium 'citrosum' is hardy to USDA Zone 10–11.
