= Pengeri =

Region of Assam

- Region
- Map of Assam Pengeri (India)
- Coordinates: 27.4394°N 95.7642°E
- Country: India
- State: Assam
- District: Tinsukia
- Region: Pengeri

Area
  - Total: 30 km^{2} (12 sq mi)

Languages
  - Official: Assamese
- Time zone: UTC+5:30 (IST)
- Postal code: 786174

Pengeri also named as Pengeeree is a region in the Tinsukia district of Assam, India. Pengeri covers approximately 30 square kilometers, and carries a vast history of militancy.

Until 1992, Pengeri was India's largest producer of citronella.
