= Mosquito plant =

Mosquito plant is a common name for several plants and may refer to:

- Azolla species (duckweed ferns)
- Agastache cana (Texas hummingbird mint)
- Pelargonium 'citrosum' (Citrosa geranium, citronella plant)
- Verbena officinalis (Common vervain)
