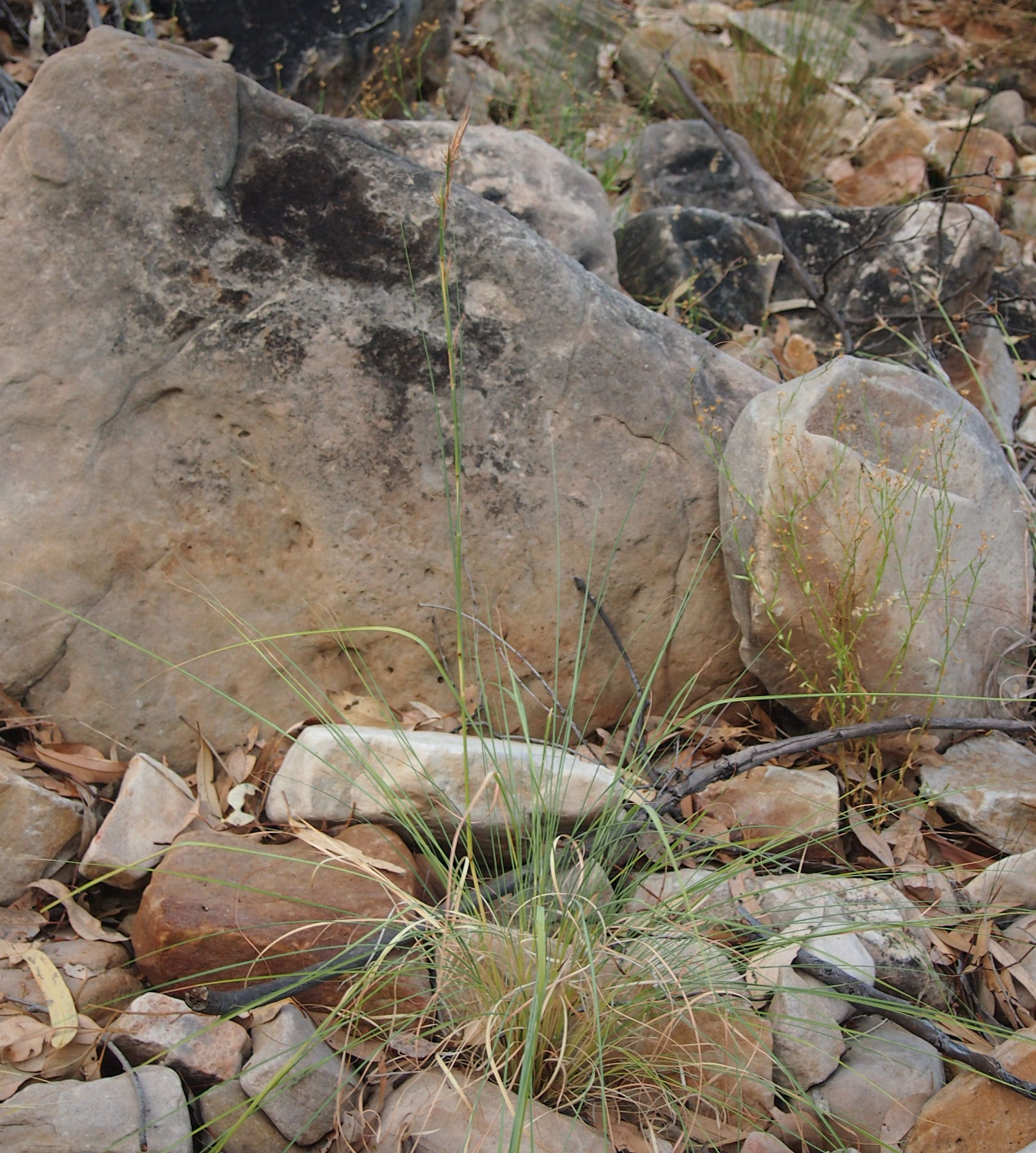

Scientific classification
- Kingdom: Plantae
- Clade: Tracheophytes
- Clade: Angiosperms
- Clade: Monocots
- Clade: Commelinids
- Order: Poales
- Family: Poaceae
- Subfamily: Panicoideae
- Genus: Cymbopogon
- Species: C. ambiguus

Binomial name
- Cymbopogon ambiguus A.Camus

= Cymbopogon ambiguus =

Species of grass

Cymbopogon ambiguus, or Australian lemon-scented grass, is a plant species in the family Poaceae. It has fragrant, bluish-green grey leaves and fluffy seed heads. It is self-fertile.

== Cultivation ==
Cymbopogon ambiguus needs a sunny position. It can tolerate extreme dryness once established. Propagation is by division of clumps or from seed. Lemongrass can be grown in any soil and needs very little water. It grows to a height of 1.8 m (5 ft 11 in).

== Uses ==
Infusions and concoctions of Cymbopogon ambiguus have been used in traditional Aboriginal Australian medicine to treat headaches, chest infections, and muscle cramps. It has also been proposed as a candidate for rhizoremediation of hydrocarbon-contaminated soils.

== Read also ==
- Cymbopogon
