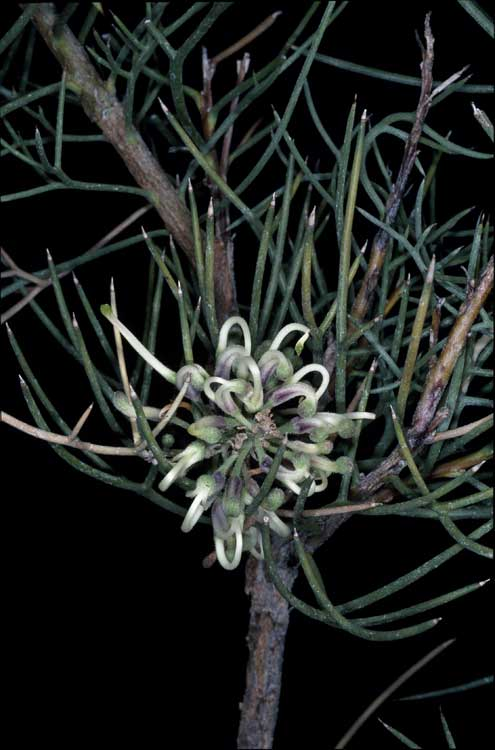
- Specimen in the ANBG

Conservation status
- Endangered (EPBC Act)

- Critically Endangered (IUCN 3.1)

Scientific classification
- Kingdom: Plantae
- Clade: Tracheophytes
- Clade: Angiosperms
- Clade: Eudicots
- Order: Proteales
- Family: Proteaceae
- Genus: Hakea
- Species: H. pulvinifera

Binomial name
- Hakea pulvinifera L.A.S.Johnson

= Hakea pulvinifera =

Species of shrub endemic to Australia

Hakea pulvinifera, also known as Lake Keepit Hakea, is a small, prickly shrub in the family Proteaceae, found only on one rocky hillside at Lake Keepit near Gunnedah in New South Wales, Australia. The species was first described in 1962, believed extinct in 1971 and rediscovered in 1988. The entire species may be of only one genetically unique individual. It is one of only two Hakea species that reproduce solely through basal shoots or 'suckering', reducing genetic variation.

== Description ==
Hakea pulvinifera is a shrub which grows to about 4 m (10 ft) high and has thick, tessellated bark. The leaves are 10 cm (4 in) long, divided into two to nine segments each 2–4 cm (0.8–2 in) long and 2 mm (0.08 in) wide, each ending in a sharp point. The flowers are arranged in groups of forty to fifty creamy-white and green flowers in leaf axils. Flowering occurs from September to November but the pollen grains are shrivelled and empty. Fruit have never been seen on plants of this species. This species only reproduces naturally through suckering and the entire population may consist of one or a few clones. Fresh, fixed and dried flowers tested have been found to be sterile, with no evidence of viable pollen, suggesting that the species cannot reproduce from seed. Instead, they regenerate by suckering from roots running below the soil surface.

== Taxonomy and naming ==
This species was first formally described by Australian taxonomic botanist Lawrence Alexander Sidney Johnson in 1962 and the description was published in Contributions from the New South Wales National Herbarium. The specific epithet is from the Latin pulvinus meaning "cushion", "pad" or "pillow" and fero meaning "to bear" or "to carry" referring to the swelling at the base of the leaf.

Hakea pulvinifera was only discovered in 1949 from a single population but the species was not named until 1962. The population was visited again in 1966 and detailed information recorded; however, in 1971 a search based on the 1966 data failed to locate the species. It was proposed the species was extinct, the type population having been lost in the construction of a car park. In 1988, a National Parks and Wildlife Service ranger, S.P. Morrison, "discovered" the species in a localised population on a steep hillside similar in features and aspect to the type locality, using information from Lawrence Johnson's original 1962 notes. The "newly found" population is almost certainly the same one first recorded, despite certain differences in landmarks between this locality and that previously described. The identity of the population was confirmed by William Robert Barker.

== Distribution and habitat ==
This species is only known from a single population, occurring on a steep slope located within the Lake Keepit Recreation Area, north-east of Gunnedah in New South Wales. The population consists of less than 150 individuals and is spread over an area of less than a hectare. It grows in well-drained, skeletal sandy-clay soils within a dry subtropical climate.

The vegetation of the population's site is open woodland with tall shrubs and sparse groundcover, dominated by the conifer Callitris glaucophylla in the highest stratum. H. pulvinifera grows amongst other shrubs, including Alstonia constricta and Acacia decora. A sparse ground cover of grasses and forbs forms the ground layer but at least fifty percent of this site is bare earth or rock. The most common ground-cover species is an introduced species, Petrorhagia nanteuilli. Other common ground-cover plants include Verbascum virgatum, which is also an introduced species, and the native grasses Themeda australis, Cymbopogon obtectus, Heteropogon contorta and Aristida sp.

== Conservation status ==
Hakea pulvinifera is classified as "endangered" by the Australian Government Environment Protection and Biodiversity Conservation Act 1999 and the New South Wales Government Threatened Species Conservation Act. It is also listed as "critically endangered" on the IUCN Red List of Threatened Species.

Due to its restricted distribution and assumed low genetic diversity, the species is highly vulnerable to stochastic processes. Threats to the species include disturbance and soil erosion from recreational activities, browsing from livestock and feral rabbits, damage and landslips from potential floods, fire suppression and possible introduction of diseases. Some populations of the species may have been destroyed in the creation of the Lake Keepit Dam, which was completed in 1960.

A recovery plan for the species has been prepared in 2000 by the NSW National Parks and Wildlife Service.

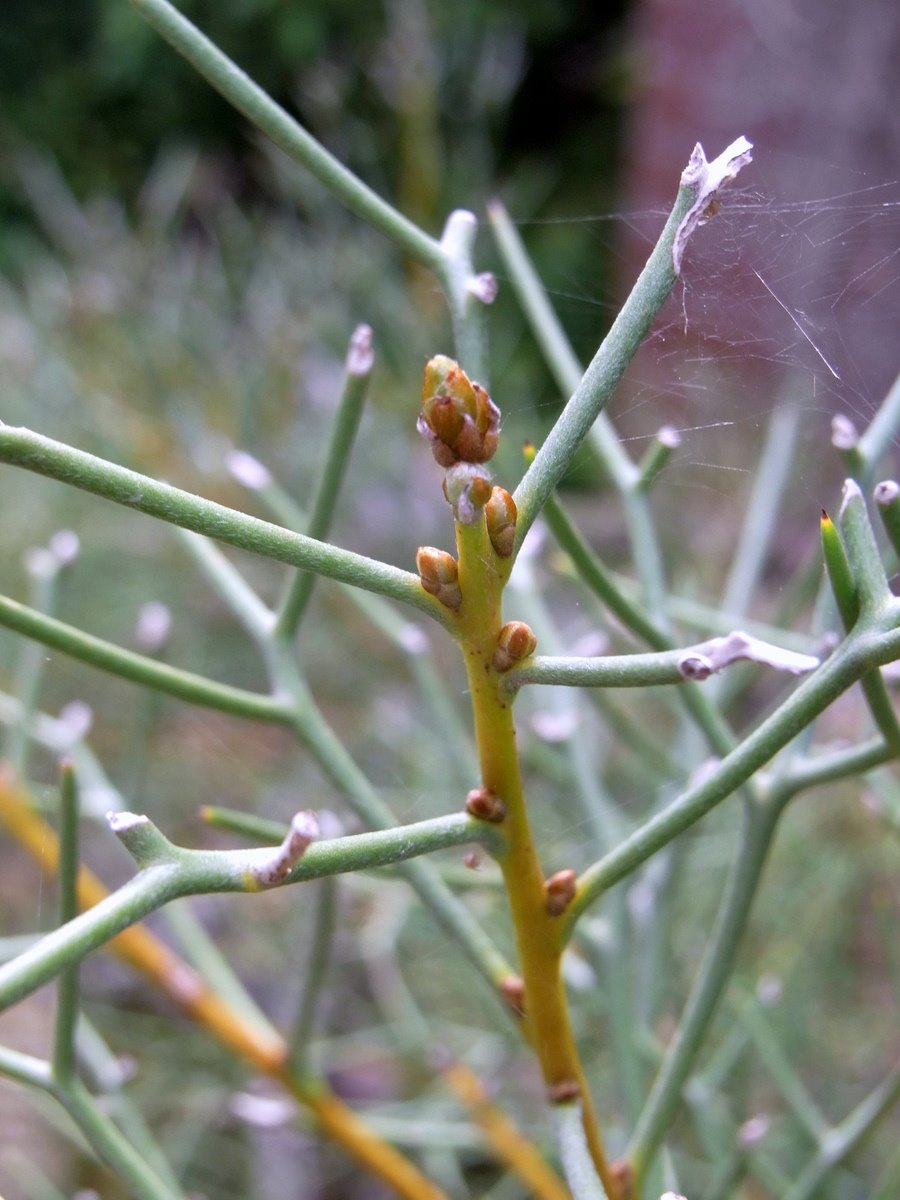
Leaf detail
