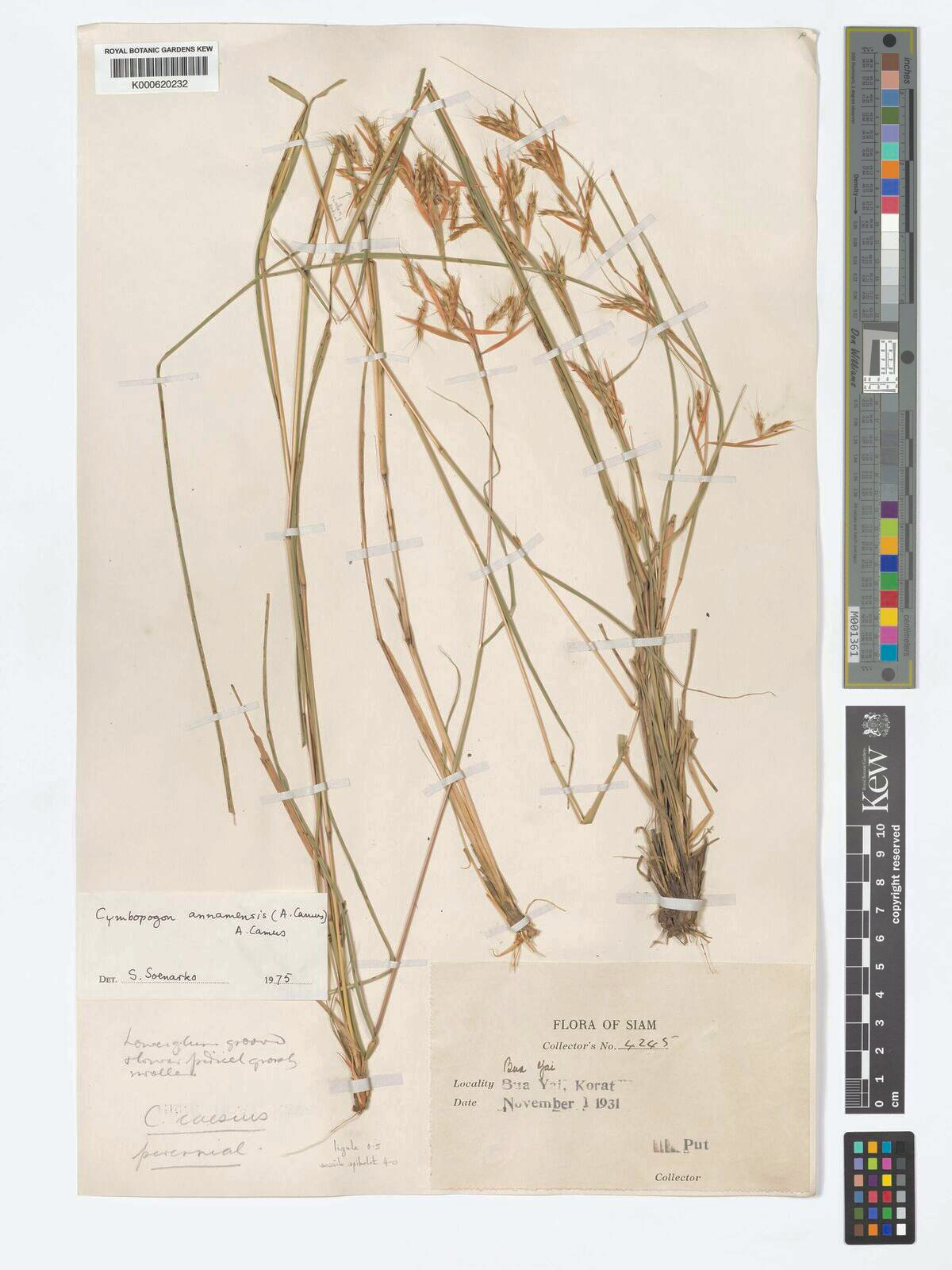

Scientific classification
- Kingdom: Plantae
- Clade: Embryophytes
- Clade: Tracheophytes
- Clade: Angiosperms
- Clade: Monocots
- Clade: Commelinids
- Order: Poales
- Family: Poaceae
- Subfamily: Panicoideae
- Genus: Cymbopogon
- Species: C. annamensis

Binomial name
- Cymbopogon annamensis (A.Camus) A.Camus

= Cymbopogon annamensis =

Species of plant

Cymbopogon annamensis is a perennial grass in the Poaceae family. It is native to China (Yunnan), Laos, Thailand, and Vietnam. It primarily grows in wet tropical biomes.

== Description ==
Cymbopogon annamensis is a slender, tufted perennial grass up to one meter tall that features narrow, reddish-brown panicles and grows in the open forests of southern China and Indochina. It is visually distinguished from close relatives like C. caesius and C. mekongensis primarily by its swollen lowermost pedicel, shorter ligules, and darker inflorescences.
