= Cymbopogon minor =

Scientific classification
- Kingdom: Plantae
- Clade: Embryophytes
- Clade: Tracheophytes
- Clade: Angiosperms
- Clade: Monocots
- Clade: Commelinids
- Order: Poales
- Family: Poaceae
- Subfamily: Panicoideae
- Genus: Cymbopogon
- Species: C. minor

Binomial name
- Cymbopogon minor B.S.Sun & R.Zhang ex S.M.Phillips & S.L.Chen

Species of grass

Cymbopogon minor is a species of perennial grass in the Poaceae family. It is native to China (North-Eastern Yunnan). It primarily grows in temperate condition. Cymbopogon minor grows at 900 meters above sea level.
