= Cymbopogon bhutanicus =

Conservation status
- Vulnerable (IUCN 3.1)

Scientific classification
- Kingdom: Plantae
- Clade: Embryophytes
- Clade: Tracheophytes
- Clade: Angiosperms
- Clade: Monocots
- Clade: Commelinids
- Order: Poales
- Family: Poaceae
- Subfamily: Panicoideae
- Genus: Cymbopogon
- Species: C. bhutanicus

Binomial name
- Cymbopogon bhutanicus Noltie

Species of plant

Cymbopogon bhutanicus is a species of perennial grass in the family Poaceae that is endemic to Bhutan and typically grows in temperate biomes.

== Description ==
Cymbopogon bhutanicus is an endemic grass that typically grows on dry, rocky mountain banks within Bhutanese pine forests at elevations ranging from 700 to 1,400 meters above sea level, though its population is currently declining and restricted to only six known locations.

== Conservation status ==
According to the IUCN Red List, Cymbopogon bhutanicus is classified as Vulnerable due to a decreasing population, habitat loss from invasive species, and agricultural expansion.
