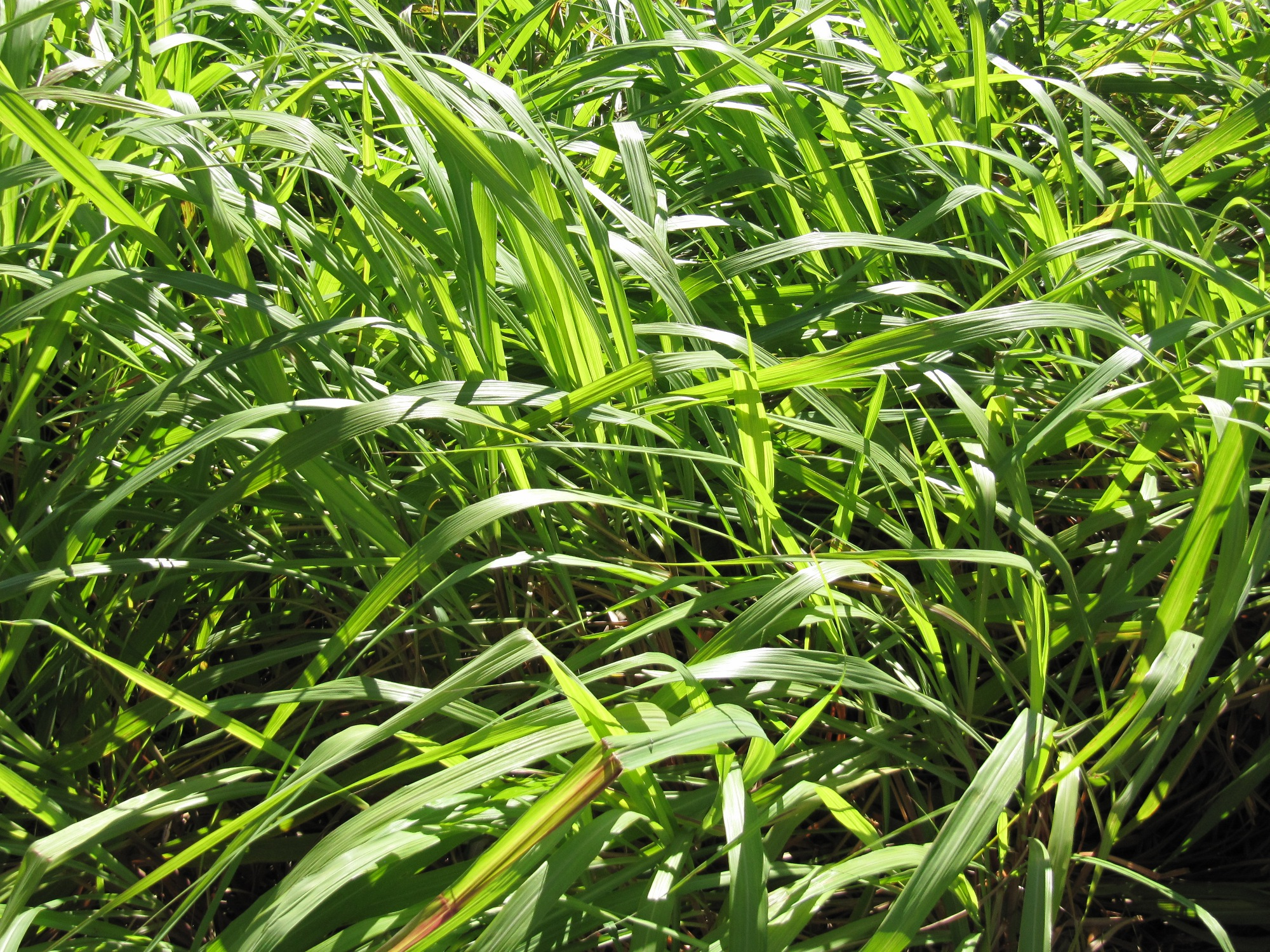

Scientific classification
- Kingdom: Plantae
- Clade: Tracheophytes
- Clade: Angiosperms
- Clade: Monocots
- Clade: Commelinids
- Order: Poales
- Family: Poaceae
- Subfamily: Panicoideae
- Genus: Cymbopogon
- Species: C. winterianus

Binomial name
- Cymbopogon winterianus Jowitt ex Bor

= Cymbopogon winterianus =

Species of plant

Cymbopogon winterianus, common name Java citronella, is a perennial aromatic plant from the family Poaceae, originating in western Malesia. Used in perfumery products and cosmetics, a source of Citronella oil.
