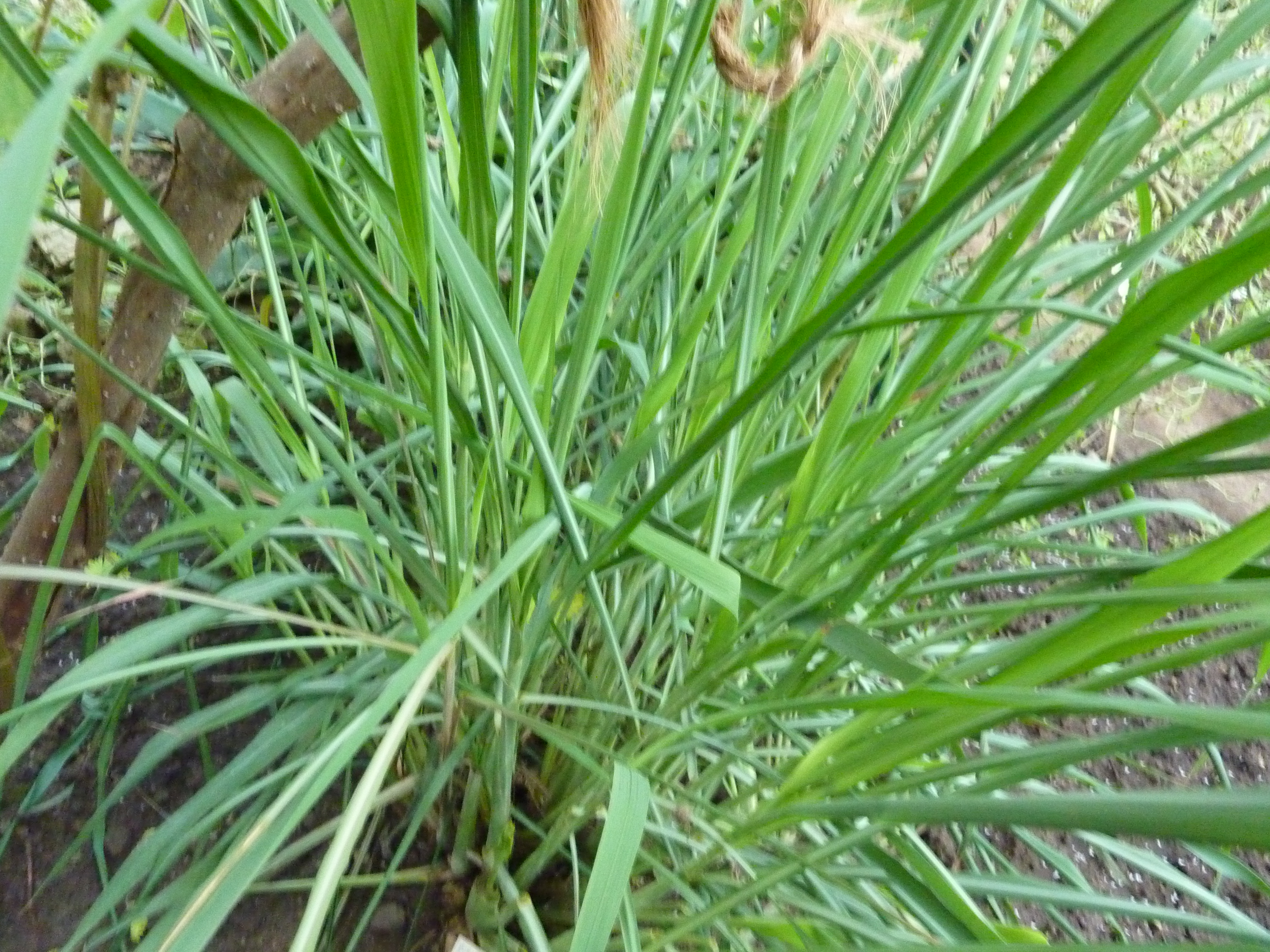

Scientific classification
- Kingdom: Plantae
- Clade: Tracheophytes
- Clade: Angiosperms
- Clade: Monocots
- Clade: Commelinids
- Order: Poales
- Family: Poaceae
- Subfamily: Panicoideae
- Genus: Cymbopogon
- Species: C. nardus

Binomial name
- Cymbopogon nardus (L.) Rendle

Synonyms
- Andropogon nardus Linnaeus, 1753

= Cymbopogon nardus =

Species of plant

Cymbopogon nardus, common name citronella grass, is a species of perennial aromatic plant from the family Poaceae, originating in tropical Asia. C. nardus cannot be eaten because of its unpalatable nature and is an invasive species that renders pastureland useless, since cattle will starve even in its abundance.

It is the source of an essential oil known as citronella oil, which is widely used for its natural insect-repelling properties. Essential oils are extracted from the aerial parts and applied topically or slowly burned (e.g. in a "citronella candle") as an insect repellent, particularly to deter haematophagous insects such as mosquitoes.
