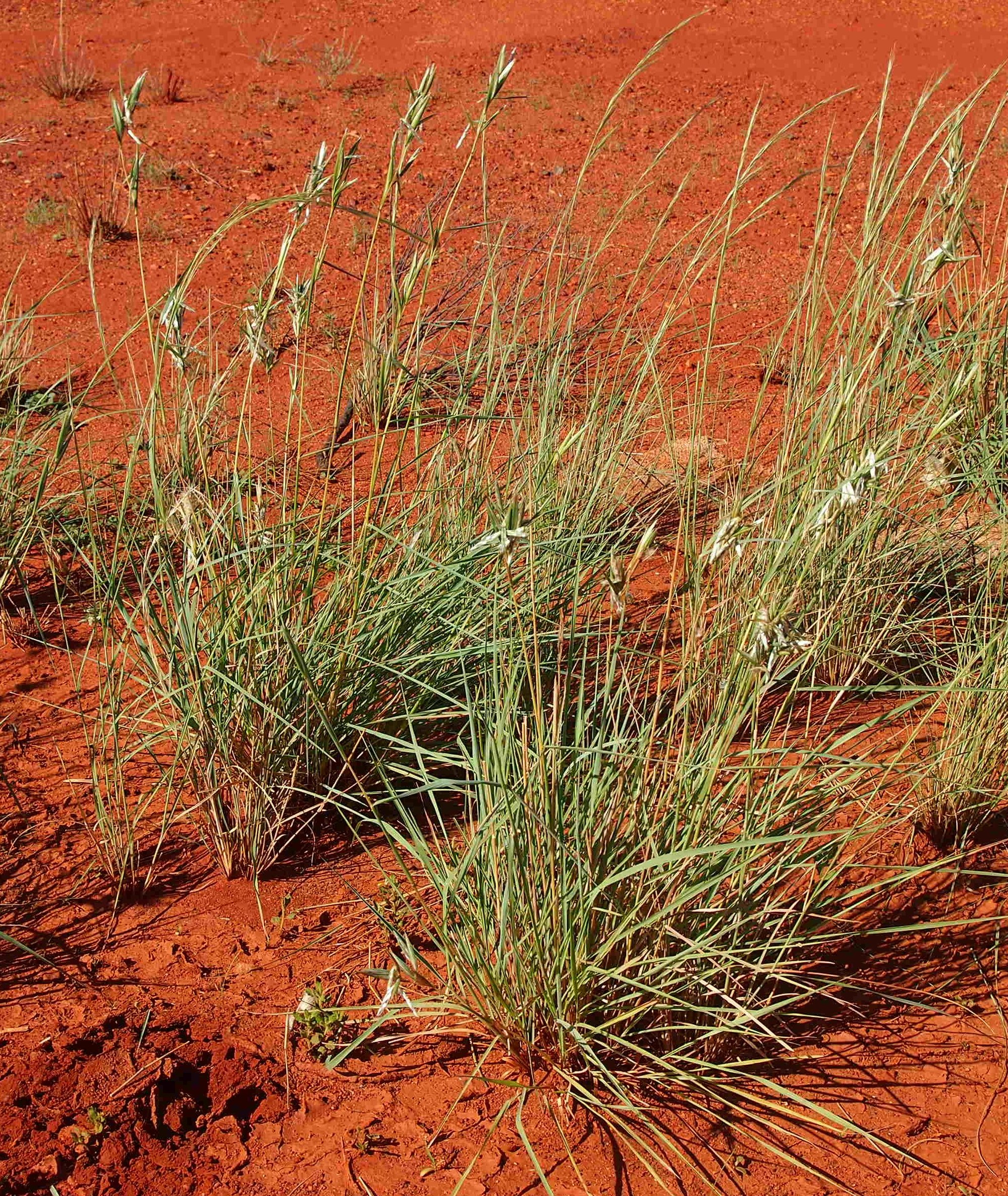

Scientific classification
- Kingdom: Plantae
- Clade: Tracheophytes
- Clade: Angiosperms
- Clade: Monocots
- Clade: Commelinids
- Order: Poales
- Family: Poaceae
- Subfamily: Panicoideae
- Genus: Cymbopogon
- Species: C. bombycinus

Binomial name
- Cymbopogon bombycinus (R. Br.) Domin

Synonyms
- Andropogon bombycinus R. Br.; Andropogon exaltatus (R. Br.) Hack.; Andropogon lanatus R. Br.; Andropogon procerus Hack.; Sorghum bombycinum (R. Br.) Kuntze

= Cymbopogon bombycinus =

Species of grass

Cymbopogon bombycinus, or citronella grass (also called silky oil grass) is a species of perennial grass in the family Poaceae that is native to Australia.

== Description ==
Cymbopogon bombycinus is a tufted perennial bunchgrass, without stolons or rhizomes. The culms, or stems of the grass, range from .5–1.5 m (1 ft 8 in – 4 ft 11 in) in height and are smooth, though the nodes may be hairy.

The leaves of the plant are 5–30 cm (2.0–11.8 in) in length and are 1–4 mm (0.039–0.157 in) wide, and smooth on both faces. The crushed leaf gives off a strong citrus-like scent.

The inflorescence of the plant, or the collections of flowers, are composed of 10–30 cm (3.9–11.8 in) long section of spikelets largely concealed by long hairs.

== Taxonomy ==
The species name bombycinus is derived from the Greek "bombyx" and "bombykos", meaning "silk" or "silk-garment", referring to the silky hairs of the spikelets. The name is also derived from the Latin "bombyx" and "bycis", meaning "silk" or "silk-worm", referring to the same silky hairs.

== Habitat and ecology ==
Cymbopogon bombycinus is found mostly in southwestern areas of Australia, in tropical and subtropical regions of Queensland, New South Wales, the Northern Territory, and Western Australia. The species occurs on sandy and stony soils along stream banks or on alluvial flats, and occasionally in eucalyptus woodlands.

== Uses ==
Aboriginal peoples of Australia burn and rub the plant on the body for colds and pain, and soak the plant in water and use the liquid to treat sore eyes. The plant is also eaten in the summer despite its strong aromatic scent, but the plants becomes harsh as it ages and is seldom eaten old.
