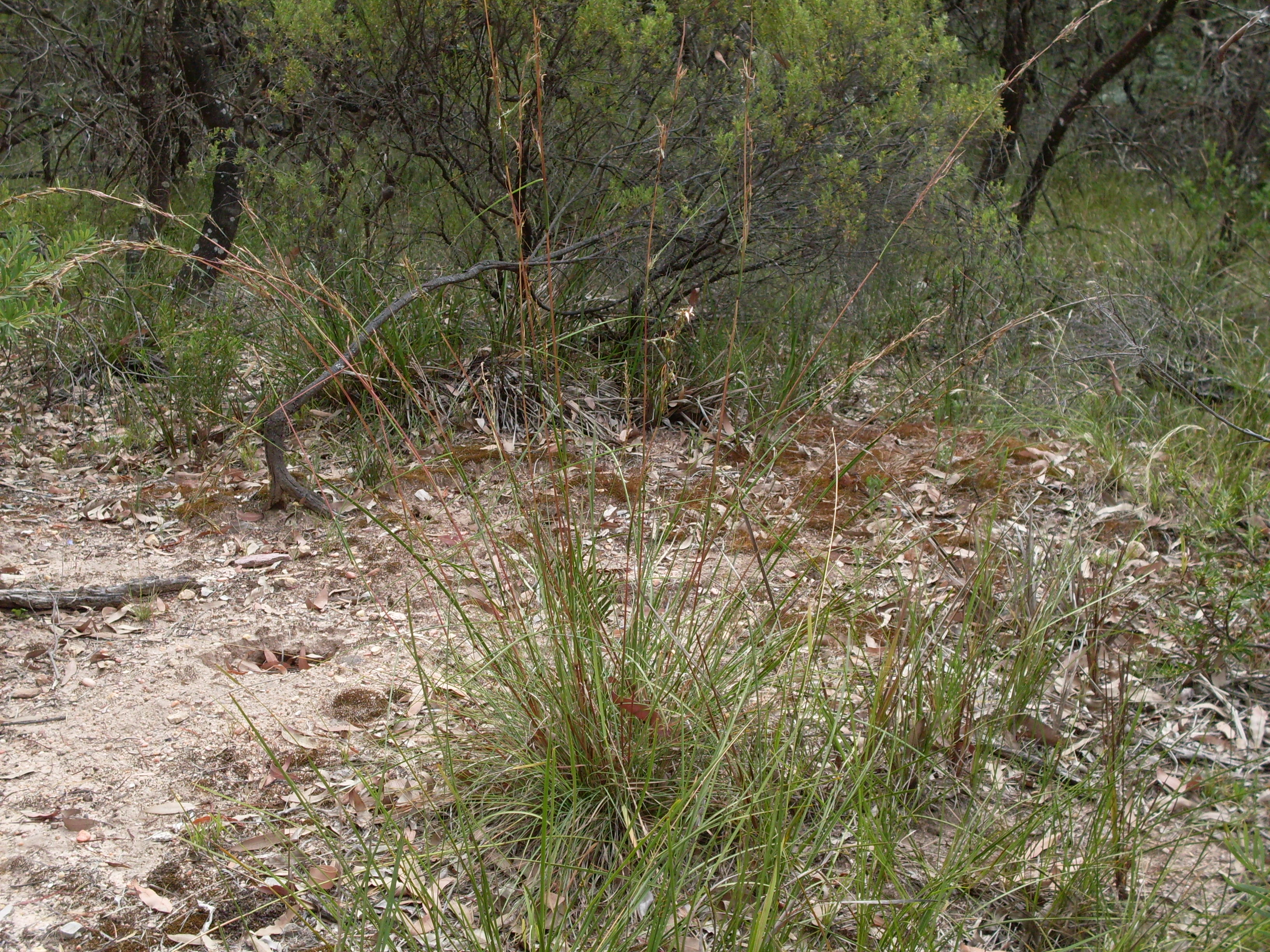

Scientific classification
- Kingdom: Plantae
- Clade: Tracheophytes
- Clade: Angiosperms
- Clade: Monocots
- Clade: Commelinids
- Order: Poales
- Family: Poaceae
- Subfamily: Panicoideae
- Genus: Cymbopogon
- Species: C. refractus

Binomial name
- Cymbopogon refractus (R.Br.) Camus

Synonyms
- Andropogon refractus R. Br.

= Cymbopogon refractus =

Species of grass

Cymbopogon refractus, commonly known as barbed wire grass, is a species of perennial grass in the genus Cymbopogon of the family Poaceae. It is native to Australia.

== Description ==
Cymbopogon refractus is a tufted perennial bunchgrass, without stolons or rhizomes. The culms, or stems of the grass are to 1 m (3 ft 3 in) in height and branching at the nodes. The nodes are purplish and hairless.

The leaves of the plant are basal and on the stems. The leaf is hairless and when crushed gives off a lemon-ginger scent like other grasses in the genus Cymbopogon.

The inflorescence of the plant, or the collections of flowers, are arranged on a 10–45 cm (3.9–17.7 in) long stem with clusters of short, nearly hairless branches which bend downwards when mature, giving the inflorescence a barbed-wire appearance. The spikelets are paired, one stalked the other unstalked. Flowering mostly spring to autumn.

== Taxonomy ==
Cymbopogon refractus was first described by R. Brown in 1810 as Andropogon refractus, but in 1921 was placed in the genus Cymbopogon by Camus.

== Habitat and ecology ==
Cymbopogon refractus is widespread on poor soils of roadsides, native pastures, woodlands and forests of Queensland, New South Wales, the Northern Territory, and Victoria. It is very drought tolerant but readily frosted.
