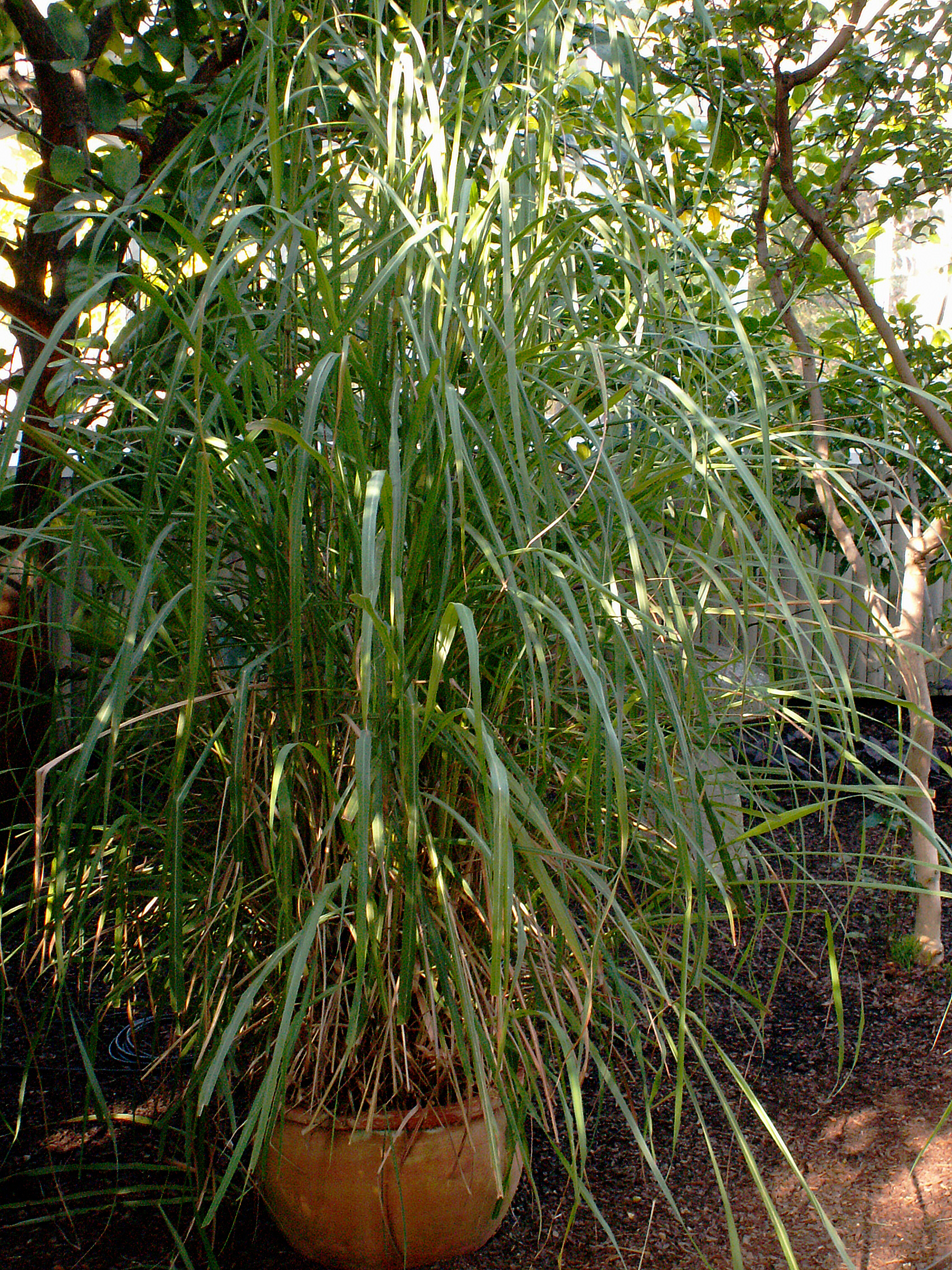

Scientific classification
- Kingdom: Plantae
- Clade: Tracheophytes
- Clade: Angiosperms
- Clade: Monocots
- Clade: Commelinids
- Order: Poales
- Family: Poaceae
- Subfamily: Panicoideae
- Genus: Cymbopogon
- Species: C. flexuosus

Binomial name
- Cymbopogon flexuosus (Nees ex Steud.) W.Watson

= Cymbopogon flexuosus =

Species of grass

Cymbopogon flexuosus, also called Cochin grass, East-Indian lemon grass or Malabar grass, is a perennial grass native to India, Sri Lanka, Burma, and Thailand. It is placed in the genus Cymbopogon (lemongrasses).

Its essential oil is produced by steam distillation of the freshly cut leaves, or it can be extracted using alcohol.

== List of cultivars ==
- I cauvery
- Krishna
