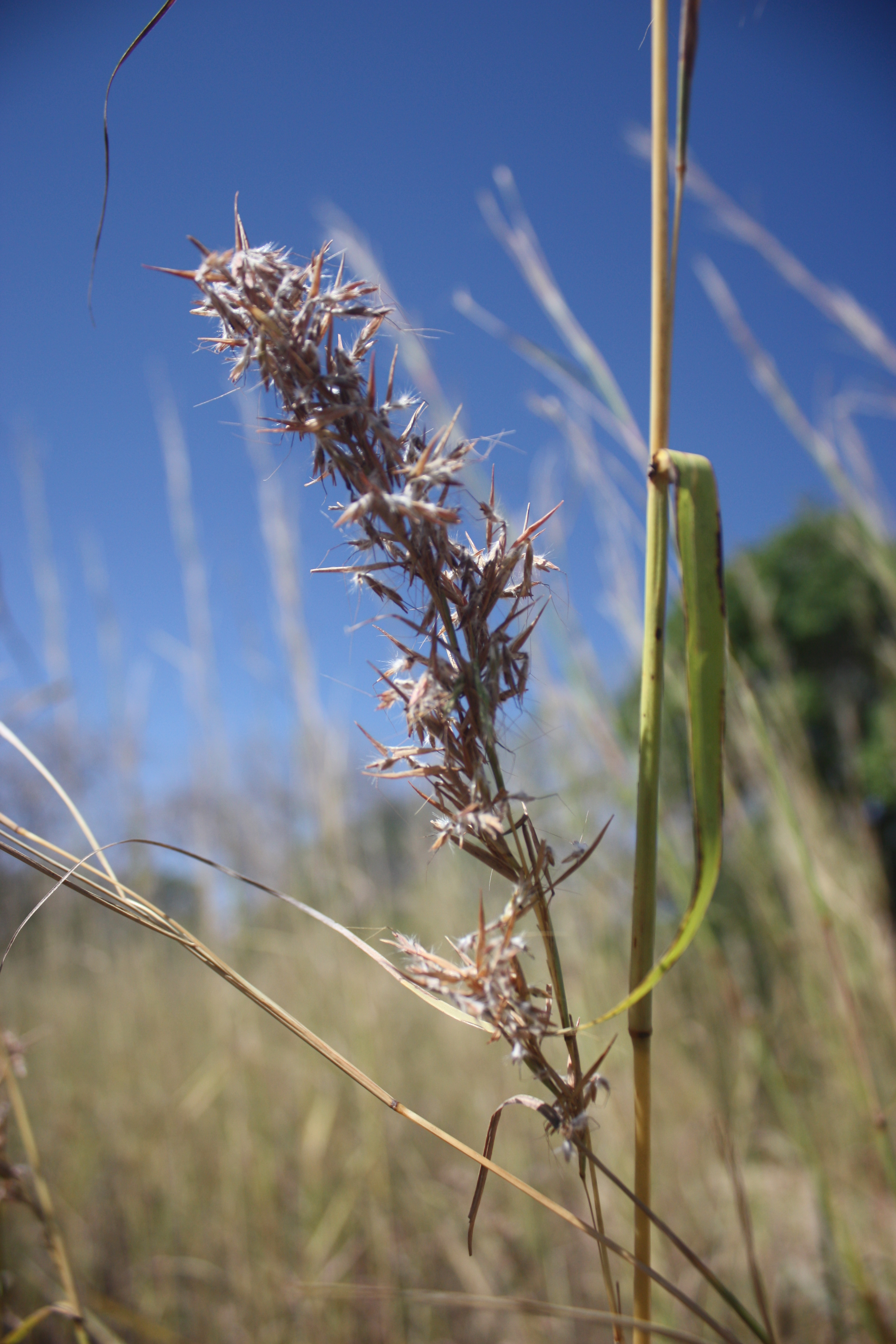

Scientific classification
- Kingdom: Plantae
- Clade: Embryophytes
- Clade: Tracheophytes
- Clade: Angiosperms
- Clade: Monocots
- Clade: Commelinids
- Order: Poales
- Family: Poaceae
- Subfamily: Panicoideae
- Genus: Cymbopogon
- Species: C. giganteus

Binomial name
- Cymbopogon giganteus Chiov.

= Cymbopogon giganteus =

Species of plant

Cymbopogon giganteus is a species of perennial grass in the family of Poaceae native to tropical Africa and Madagascar. Its leaves, flowers, and roots were traditionally used in African folk medicine especially via essential oils and decoctions.
