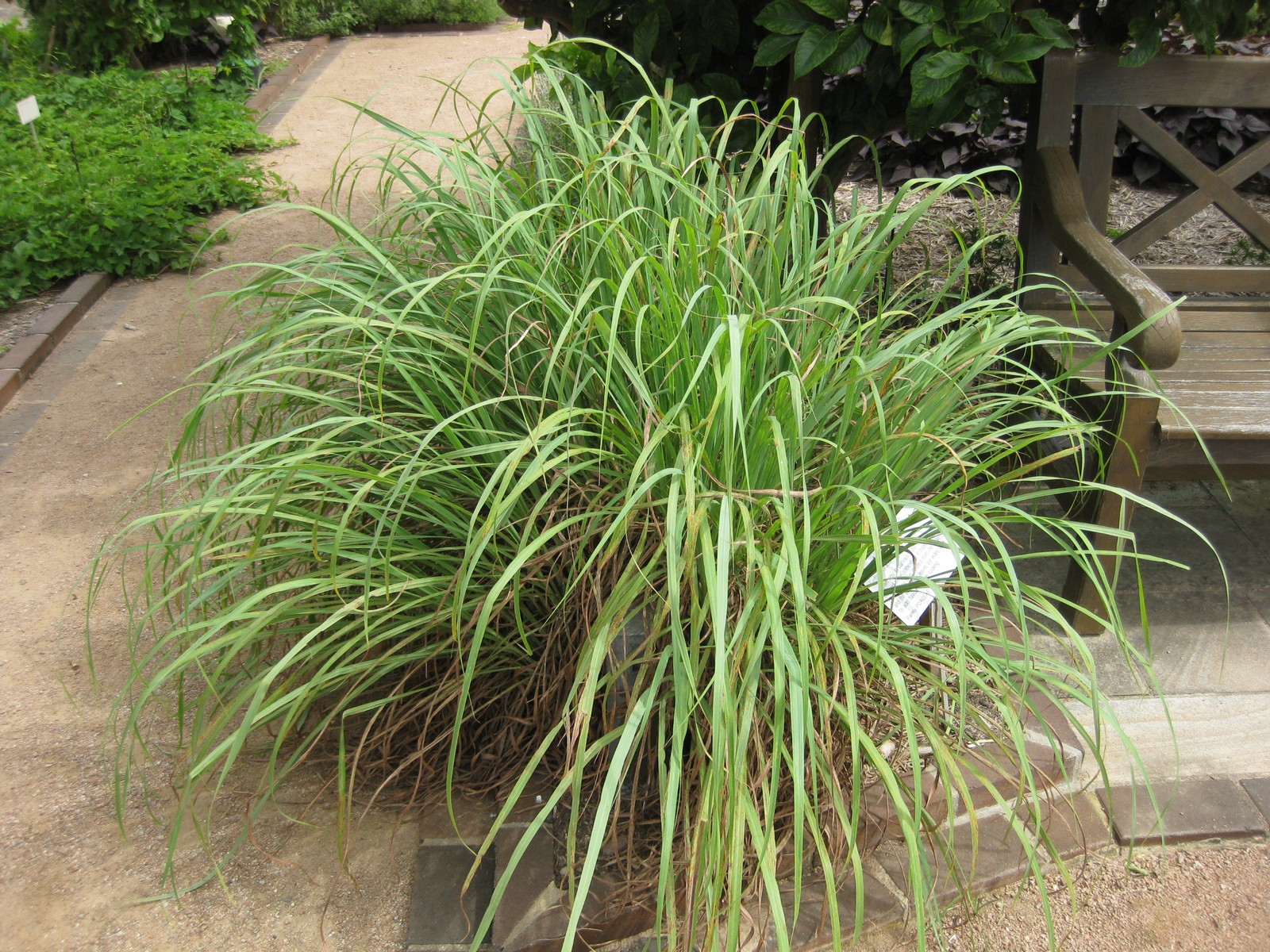

Scientific classification
- Kingdom: Plantae
- Clade: Tracheophytes
- Clade: Angiosperms
- Clade: Monocots
- Clade: Commelinids
- Order: Poales
- Family: Poaceae
- Subfamily: Panicoideae
- Genus: Cymbopogon
- Species: C. citratus

Binomial name
- Cymbopogon citratus (DC.) Stapf

Synonyms
- List: Andropogon cerifer Hack.; Andropogon citratus DC.; Andropogon roxburghii Nees ex Wight & Arn.

= Cymbopogon citratus =

Lemon grass

Species of plant

Cymbopogon citratus, commonly known as West Indian lemon grass or simply lemon grass, is a tropical plant native to South Asia and Maritime Southeast Asia and introduced to many tropical regions.

Cymbopogon citratus is often sold in stem form. While it can be grown in warmer temperate regions, it is not hardy to frost.

== Morphology ==
Cymbopogon citratus is part of the grass family, Poaceae. They contain simple, bluish-green leaves with entire margins and are linear in shape. The blades tend to be 18–36 inches long. Like other grasses, the leaves also have parallel venation.

== Distribution ==
Cymbopogon citratus is native to South Asia and Maritime Southeast Asia (Malesia). After World War I, lemongrass was introduced to Madagascar, South America, and Central America. It has now been naturalized throughout the tropics and subtropics worldwide.

In its native range, Cymbopogon citratus is known as sereh, serai, or serai dapur in Indonesia and Malaysia; and tanglad (from Proto-Austronesian *Caŋelaj originally referring to Themeda gigantea, a type of elephant grass), salai, or balioko in the Philippines. In the language of the Hmong people, who are a diasporic people spread across Southeast Asia including Laos and Thailand, it is called tauj dub.

== Culinary uses ==
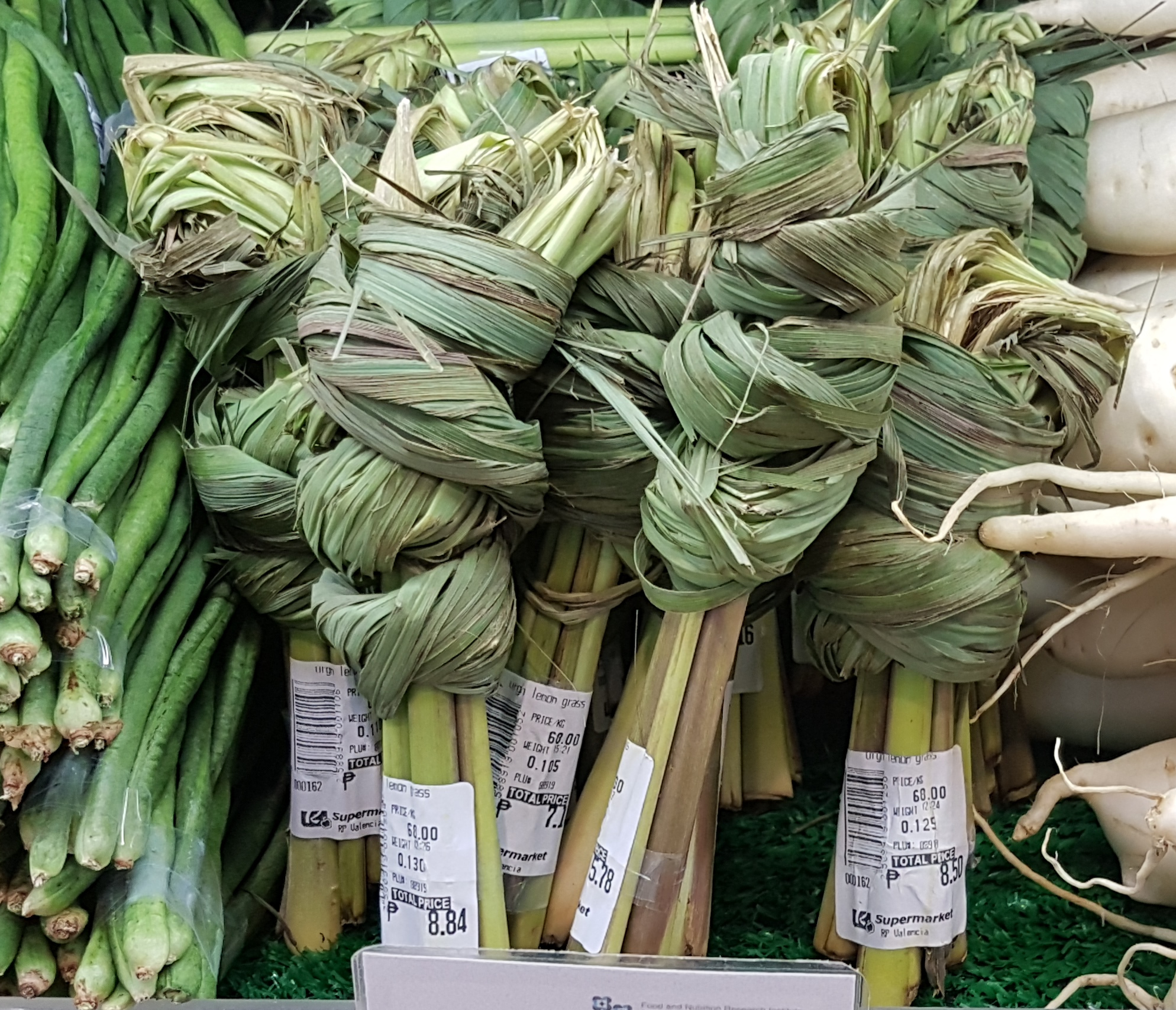
Knots of C. citratus leaves sold at a supermarket in the Philippines

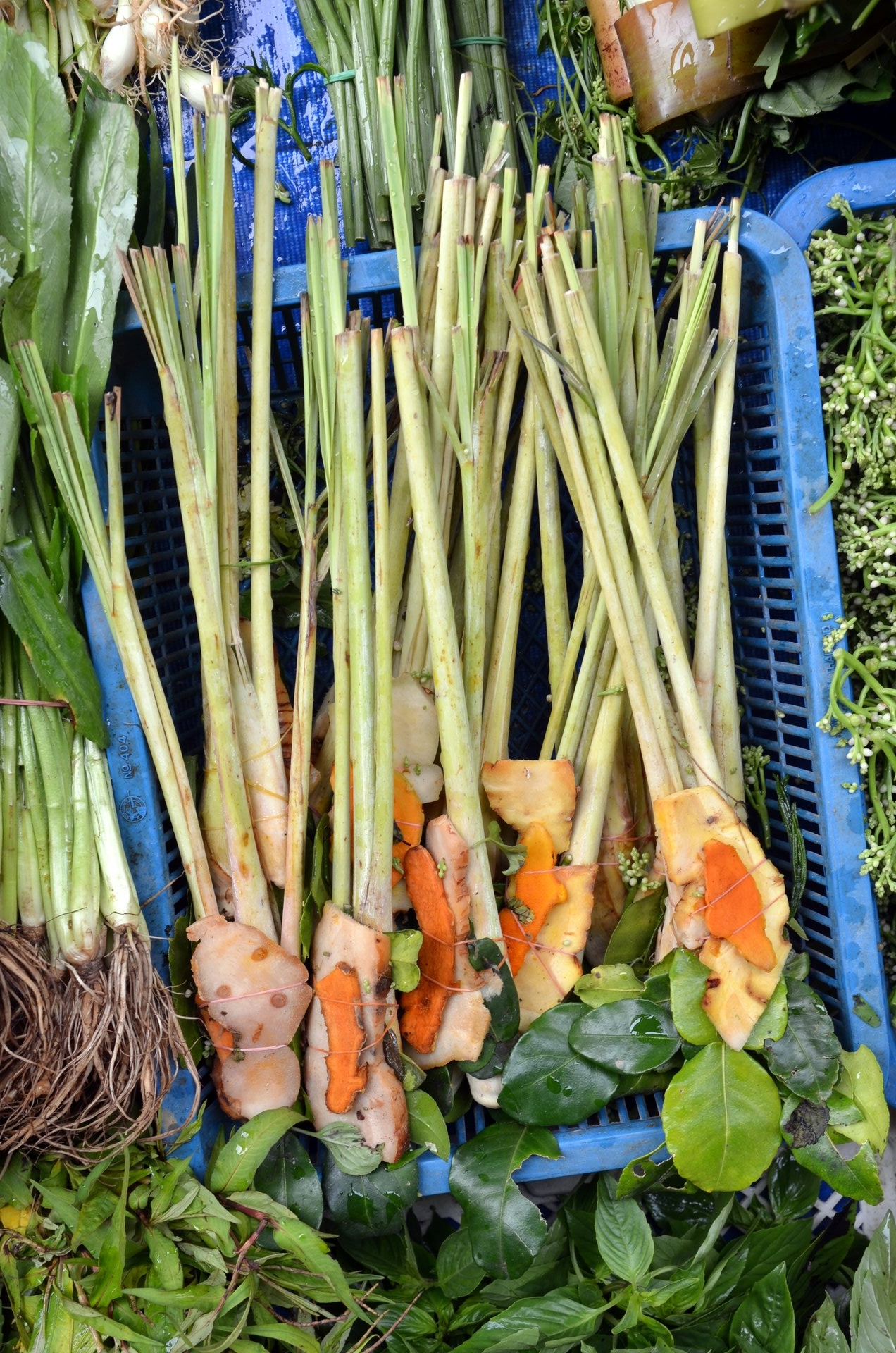
Ready-to-use bundles of lemon grass, galangal, kaffir lime leaves, and, for chicken tom yam, also turmeric, are sold at Thai markets.

Cymbopogon citratus is abundant in the Philippines and Indonesia where it is known as tanglad or sereh, respectively. Its fragrant leaves are traditionally used in cooking, particularly for lechon and roasted chicken.

The dried leaves can also be brewed into a tea, either alone or as a flavoring in other teas, imparting a flavor reminiscent of lemon juice, but with a mild sweetness without significant sourness or tartness.

In Sri Lanka, lemongrass is known as sera (සේර). It is used as a herb in cooking, in addition to its use for the essential oils.

Lemongrass in Thailand is called takhrai (ตะไคร้). It is the essential ingredient of tom yam and tom kha kai. Fresh, thin slices of lemongrass stem are also used in the snack food miangpla.

== Medicinal uses ==
The leaves of Cymbopogon citratus have been used in traditional medicine and are often found in herbal supplements and teas. Evidence of effective Cymbopogon citratus essential oil anti-protozoa activity against Leishmania amazonensis.

=== Chemical composition ===
Lemon grass oil contains 65–85% citral in addition to myrcene, citronellal, citronellol, linalool and geraniol. Hydrosteam distillation, condensation, and cooling can be used to separate the oil from the water. The hydrosol, as a by-product of the distillation process, is used for the production of skin care products such as lotions, creams, and facial cleansers. The main ingredients in these products are lemon grass oil and "negros oil" (mixture of lemon grass oil with virgin coconut oil) used in aromatherapy.

Citronellol is an essential oil constituent from Cymbopogon citratus, Cymbopogon winterianus, and Lippia alba. Citronellol has been shown to lower blood pressure in rats by a direct effect on the vascular smooth muscle leading to vasodilation. In a small, randomized, controlled trial, an infusion made from C. citratus was used as an inexpensive remedy for the treatment of oral thrush in HIV/AIDS patients.

Laboratory studies have shown cytoprotective, antioxidant, and anti-inflammatory properties in vitro.

=== Traditional medicinal use ===
In the folk medicine of the Krahô people of Brazil, it is believed to have anxiolytic, hypnotic, and anticonvulsant properties.

In traditional medicine of India the leaves of the plant are used as stimulant, sudorific, antiperiodic, and anticatarrhal, while the essential oil is used as carminative, depressant, analgesic, antipyretic, antibacterial, and antifungal agent.

== Effect on insects ==
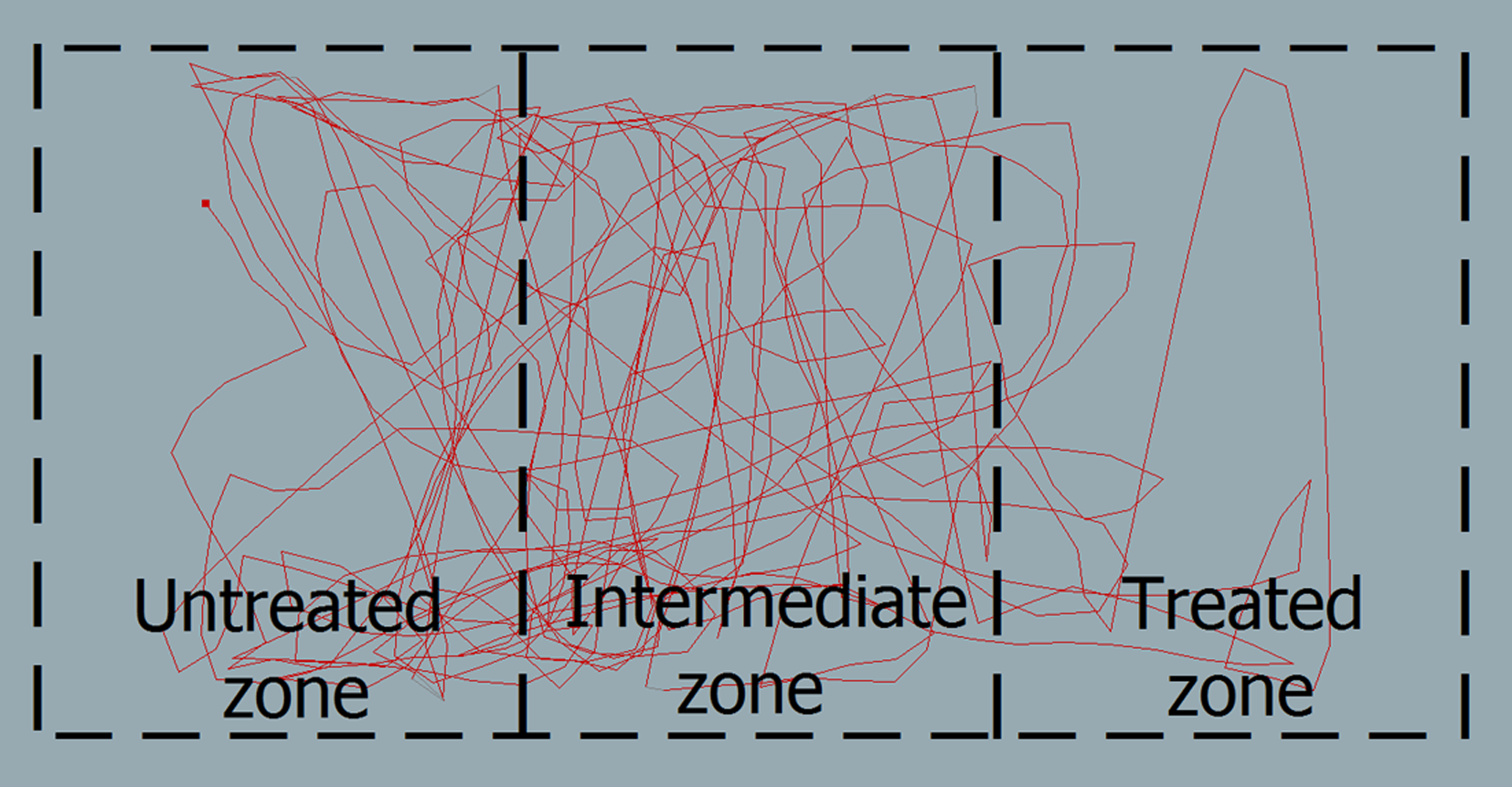
Video tracking of a stable fly, demonstrating repellency of lemongrass oil

Beekeepers sometimes use lemon grass oil in swarm traps to attract swarms. Lemon grass oil has also been tested for its ability to repel the pestilent stable fly, which bite domestic animals.

== Growing conditions ==
=== Light and Climate ===
Lemongrass (Cymbopogon citratus) thrives in full sun conditions, requiring at least 6 to 8 hours of sunlight per day. Exposure to supplemental ultraviolet-B (sUV-B) radiation has been shown to enhance both the yield and quality of essential oils. The optimal temperature range for cultivation is between 25 °C and 30 °C. The species is sensitive to low temperatures, and prolonged exposure to temperatures below 10 °C may result in plant mortality. The ideal annual rainfall ranges between 2,500 and 3,000 mm.

=== Soil condition ===
Well-drained sandy loam soil with a pH range of approximately 5.5 to 7.5 is considered optimal. Moderate soil fertility is sufficient, and the application of organic fertilizers during the early growth stage can promote tillering.

== Propagation method ==
=== Division or Tillering ===
Lemongrass (Cymbopogon citratus) is primarily propagated through division or tillering, as seed propagation is inefficient due to its rare flowering and fruiting. Mature lemongrass clumps typically consist of 50 to 200 tillers. Propagation involves cutting the upper leaves and separating rooted divisions approximately 10 to 15 cm in length from the mother plant, which can then be directly planted in the field.

=== Tissue culture ===
An efficient in vitro mass propagation system for Cymbopogon citratus has been developed using both organogenesis and somatic embryogenesis. The study optimized conditions such as liquid culture media, plant growth regulators, and temporary immersion systems (TIS) to achieve high multiplication and rooting rates. This method offers a scalable and cost-effective approach for producing lemongrass plantlets, especially useful in medicinal and essential oil production industries.

== See also ==
- GABA_{A} receptor
- GABA_{A} receptor positive allosteric agonists
