= Citronella oil =

Fragrant essential oil derived from lemongrass

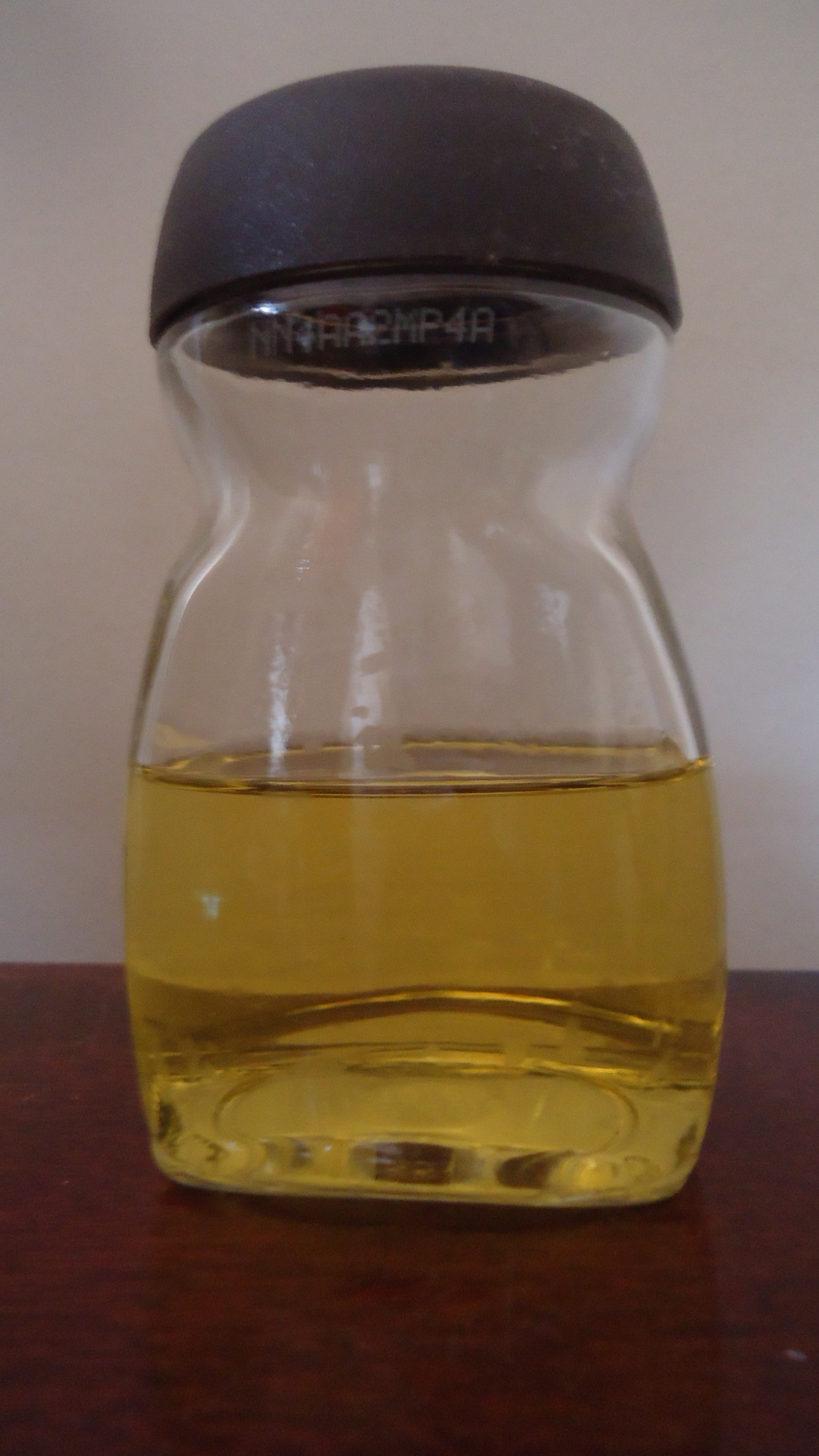
Citronella oil

Citronella oil is an essential oil obtained from the leaves and stems of different species of Cymbopogon (lemongrass). The oil is used extensively as a source of perfumery chemicals such as citronellal, citronellol, and geraniol. These chemicals find extensive use in soap, candles and incense, perfumery, cosmetic, and flavouring industries throughout the world.

Citronella oil is also a plant-based insect repellent and has been registered for this use in the United States since 1948. The United States Environmental Protection Agency considers oil of citronella as a biopesticide with a non-toxic mode of action.

Citronella oil has strong antifungal properties.

== Types ==
Citronella oil is classified in trade into two chemotypes:

=== Ceylon type ===
- CAS: 89998-15-2
- CAS: 8000-29-1
- EINECS: 289-753-6
- FEMA: 2308
- CoE: 39
- Obtained from: Cymbopogon nardus Rendle
- Main components: citronellal (5–15%), geraniol (18–20%) and geranyl acetate (2%), citronellol (6–8%), limonene (9–11%), and methyl isoeugenol (7–11%).

The major constituents of the Java type citronella oil

=== Java type ===
- CAS: 91771-61-8
- CAS: 8000-29-1
- EINECS: 294-954-7
- FEMA: 2308
- CoE: 2046
- Obtained from: Cymbopogon winterianus Jowitt
- Main components: citronellal (32–45%), geraniol (21–24%) and geranyl acetate (3–8%), citronellol (11–15%), limonene (1–4%).

The higher proportions of citronellal and geraniol in the Java type oil make it a better source for perfumery derivatives. The standard quality of Java type from Indonesia is regulated by Indonesian authority under SNI 06–3953–1995, which requires citronellal minimum 35% and total geraniol minimum 85%.

Both types probably originated from Mana Grass of Sri Lanka, which according to Finnemore (1962) occurs today in two wild forms – Cymbopogon nardus var. linnae (typicus) and C. nardus var. confertiflorus. Neither wild form is known to be used for distillation to any appreciable extent.

Citronella oil from Cymbopogon species should not be confused with other similar lemony oils from Corymbia citriodora and Pelargonium citrosum.

== Insect repellent ==
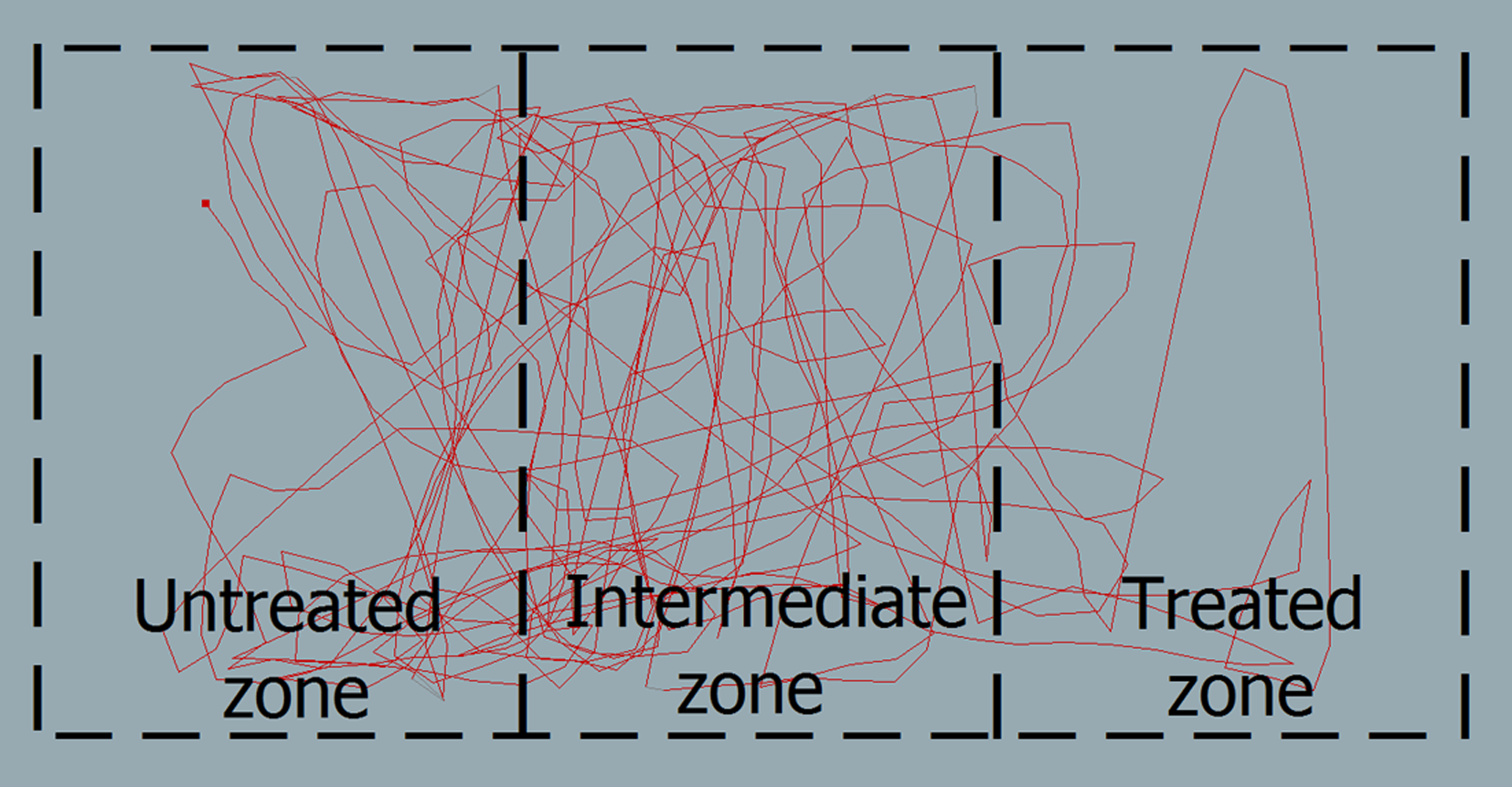
Video tracking of a stable fly, demonstrating repellency of citronella oil

Citronella oil is used especially as a mosquito repellent, particularly for Aedes aegypti (dengue fever mosquito). Research also indicates that citronella oil is an effective repellent for body lice, head lice, and stable flies. A study conducted by DARPA in 1963 determined that hydroxycitronellal was an effective repellent against both aquatic and terrestrial leeches.

Citronella candles (which burn wax mixed with citronella oil) are not effective at repelling mosquitos such as Aedes aegypti, the species of mosquito responsible for spreading dengue fever, chikungunya, Zika fever, Mayaro and yellow fever viruses, and other disease agents.

Although direct application of citronella oil to the skin is non-toxic, its use was not recommended as a topical insect repellent in Canada in 2006. Health Canada banned use of citronella oil as an insect repellent in 2012, but lifted the ban in February 2015.

== World production ==
At present, the world annual production of citronella oil is approximately 4,000 tonnes. The main producers are China and Indonesia - producing 40 percent of the world's supply. The oil is also produced in Taiwan, Guatemala, Honduras, Brazil, Sri Lanka, India, Argentina, Ecuador, Jamaica, Madagascar, Mexico, and South Africa.

The market for natural citronella oil has been eroded by chemicals synthesised from turpentine derived from conifers. However, natural citronella oil and its derivatives are preferred by the perfume industry.
