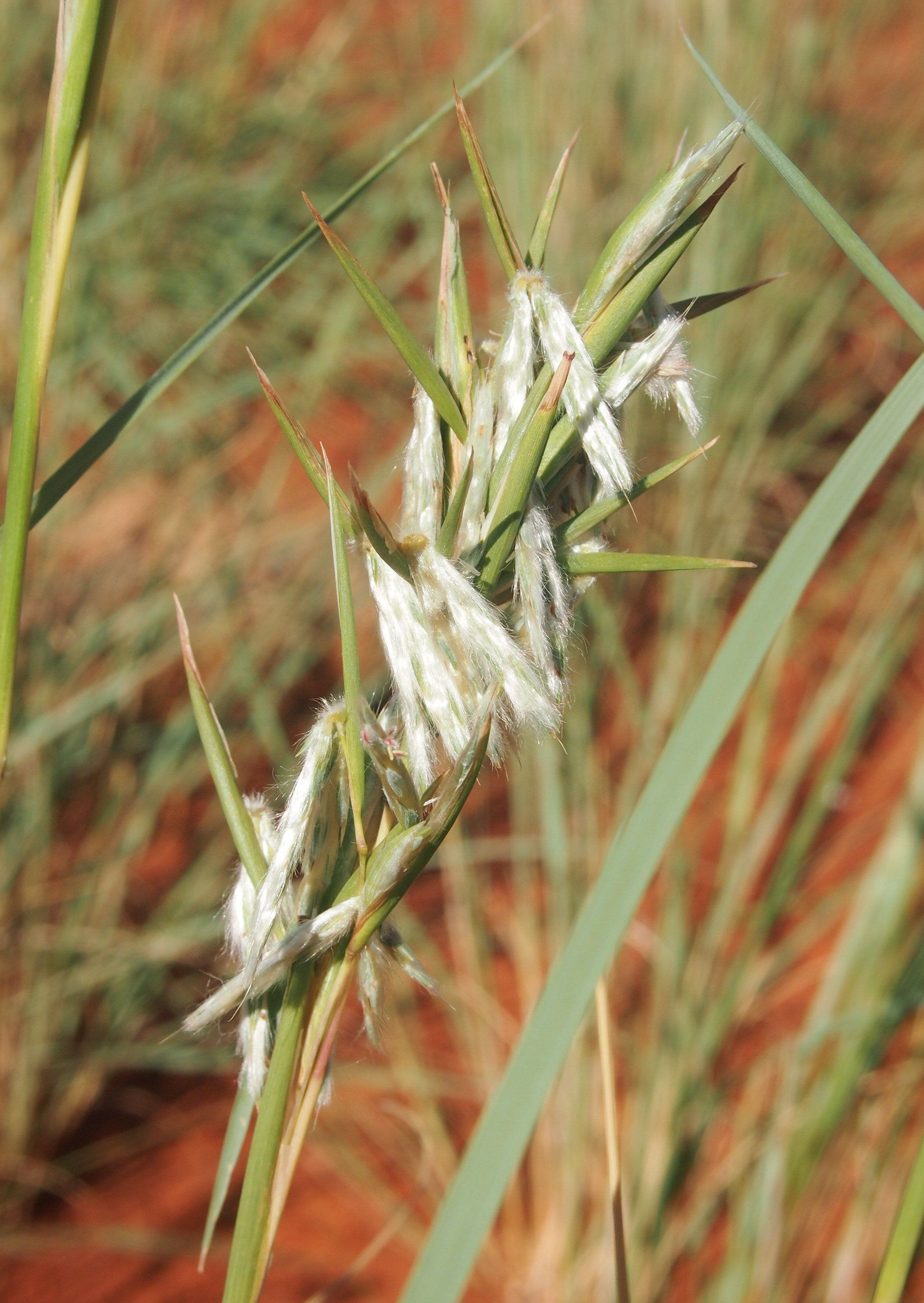

Scientific classification
- Kingdom: Plantae
- Clade: Tracheophytes
- Clade: Angiosperms
- Clade: Monocots
- Clade: Commelinids
- Order: Poales
- Family: Poaceae
- Subfamily: Panicoideae
- Genus: Cymbopogon
- Species: C. obtectus

Binomial name
- Cymbopogon obtectus S.T.Blake

= Cymbopogon obtectus =

Species of grass

Cymbopogon obtectus is a species of perennial grass in the genus Cymbopogon. The grass is native to Australia and was described by Stanley Thatcher Blake in 1944. It is found in drier areas. The plant can be harvested in the wild to produce essential oil with medicinal properties. The plant is resilient to climate change, and has been used in re-vegetation projects.
