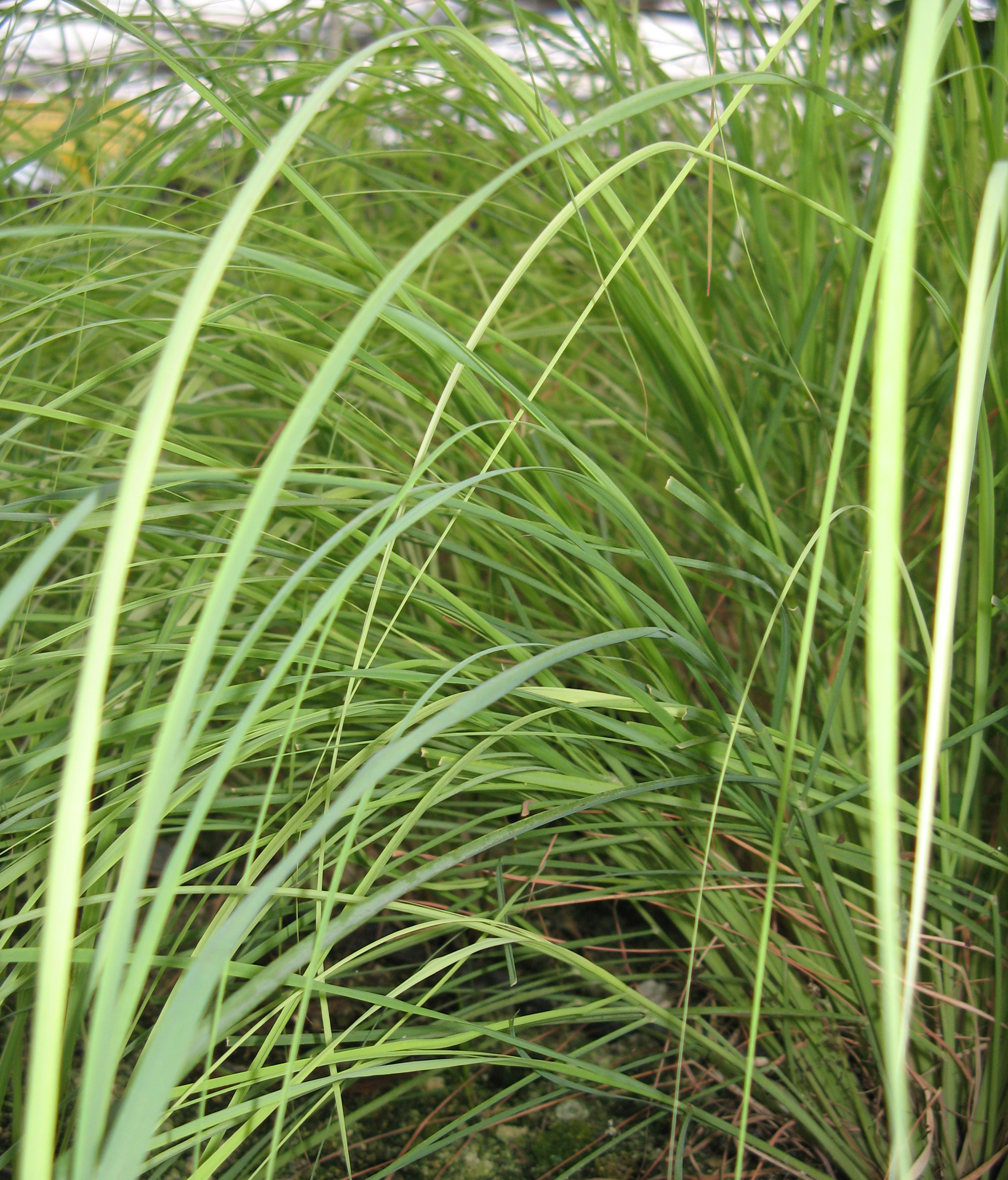

Scientific classification
- Kingdom: Plantae
- Clade: Embryophytes
- Clade: Tracheophytes
- Clade: Spermatophytes
- Clade: Angiosperms
- Clade: Monocots
- Clade: Commelinids
- Order: Poales
- Family: Poaceae
- Subfamily: Panicoideae
- Genus: Cymbopogon
- Species: C. schoenanthus

Binomial name
- Cymbopogon schoenanthus (L.) Spreng.

Subspecies
- Cymbopogon schoenanthus subsp. proximus (Hochst. ex A.Rich.) Maire & Weiller; Cymbopogon schoenanthus subsp. schoenanthus

Synonyms
- Andropogon schoenanthus L.; Cymbopogon citriodorus Link, nom. superfl.; Sorghum schoenanthus (L.) Kuntze; Trachypogon schoenanthus (L.) Nees

= Cymbopogon schoenanthus =

Species of grass

Cymbopogon schoenanthus, the camel grass, camel's hay, straw of Mecca, fever grass, geranium grass, or West Indian lemon grass, is a herbal plant of Southern Asia and Northern Africa, with fragrant foliage.

== Uses ==
Cymbopogon schoenanthus is often made into a common herbal tea. C. schoenanthus oil (called lemongrass oil or camel grass oil) is also used as a tonic and fragrance additive in personal care and cosmetic products such as hair dye, shampoo/conditioner, moisturizer/lotion, bath oil, exfoliant/scrub, anti-aging treatment, and acne treatment. In the Timbuktu-Mali region, its herbal tea is highly used, among others, for gynecological treatments (regulating womens' cycles, accompanying labor and post partum, contraception) and to relieve bloating due to gas in the digestive tract.

This plant is well-known worldwide and has significant medicinal value. This grass is type of medicine that can be used in many different illness conditions due to its minimum chemical concentration, from protecting against fever to acting as an anti fungal to treat acute skin inflammatory conditions.

The seventeenth-century English herbalist Nicholas Culpeper said about the plant:

Schoenanthus. Schoenanth, Squinanth, or Chamel's hay; hot and binding. It digests and opens the passages of the veins: surely it is as great an expeller of wind as any is.

John Hill, in his Family Herbal (1812), says that camel's hay was "at one time in great esteem as a medicine ... but it is now very little regarded".
