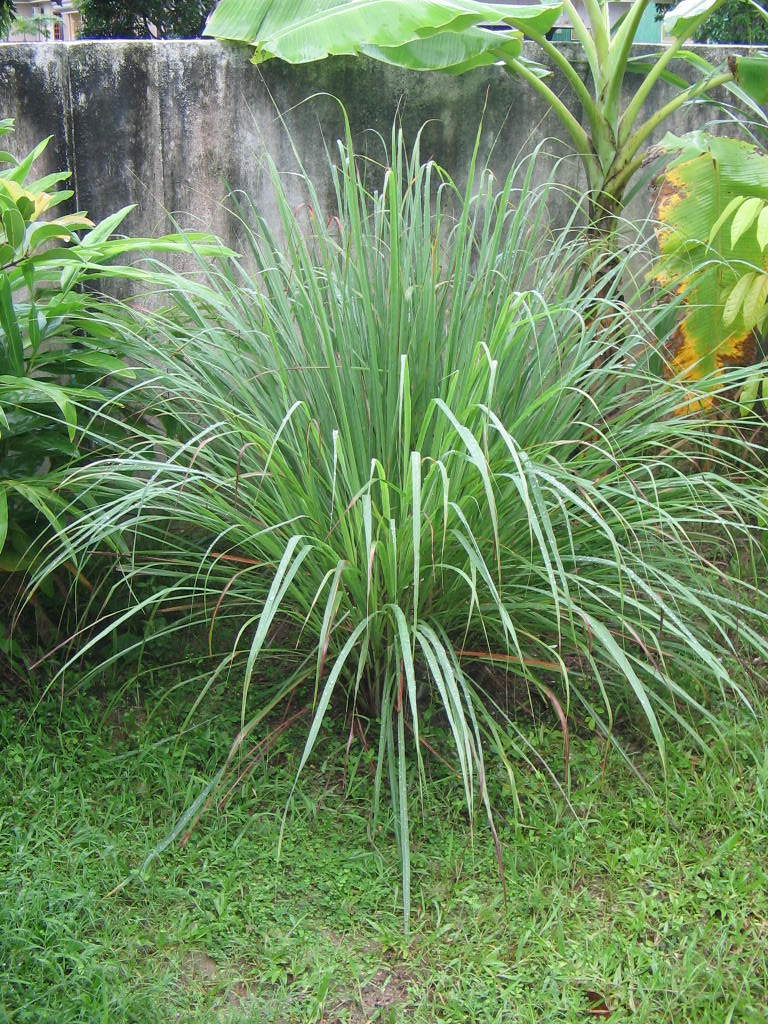
- Cymbopogon citratus

Scientific classification
- Kingdom: Plantae
- Clade: Tracheophytes
- Clade: Angiosperms
- Clade: Monocots
- Clade: Commelinids
- Order: Poales
- Family: Poaceae
- Subfamily: Panicoideae
- Supertribe: Andropogonodae
- Tribe: Andropogoneae
- Subtribe: Andropogoninae
- Genus: Cymbopogon; Spreng.

Type species
- Cymbopogon schoenanthus (L.) Spreng.

Synonyms
- Andropogon sect. Cymbopogon (Spreng.) Steud.; Andropogon subg. Cymbopogon (Spreng.) Nees; Gymnanthelia Andersson

= Cymbopogon =

Lemongrass

Genus of grasses

Cymbopogon, also known as lemongrass, barbed wire grass, silky heads, oily heads, Cochin grass, Malabar grass, citronella grass or fever grass, is a genus of Asian, African, Australian, and tropical island plants in the grass family. Some species (particularly Cymbopogon citratus) are commonly cultivated as culinary and medicinal herbs because of their scent, resembling that of lemons (Citrus limon). The name Cymbopogon derives from the Greek words kymbe (κύμβη, 'boat') and pogon (πώγων, 'beard') "which mean [that] in most species, the hairy spikelets project from boat-shaped spathes." Lemongrass and its oil are believed to possess therapeutic properties.

== Uses ==
Citronella grass (Cymbopogon nardus and Cymbopogon winterianus) grow to about 2 metres (6 1/2 ft) and have magenta-colored base stems. These species are used for the production of citronella oil, which is used in soaps, as an insect repellent (especially mosquitoes and houseflies) in insect sprays and candles, and aromatherapy. The principal chemical constituents of citronella, geraniol and citronellol, are antiseptics, hence their use in household disinfectants and soaps. Besides oil production, citronella grass is also used for culinary purposes as a flavoring.

=== Culinary ===
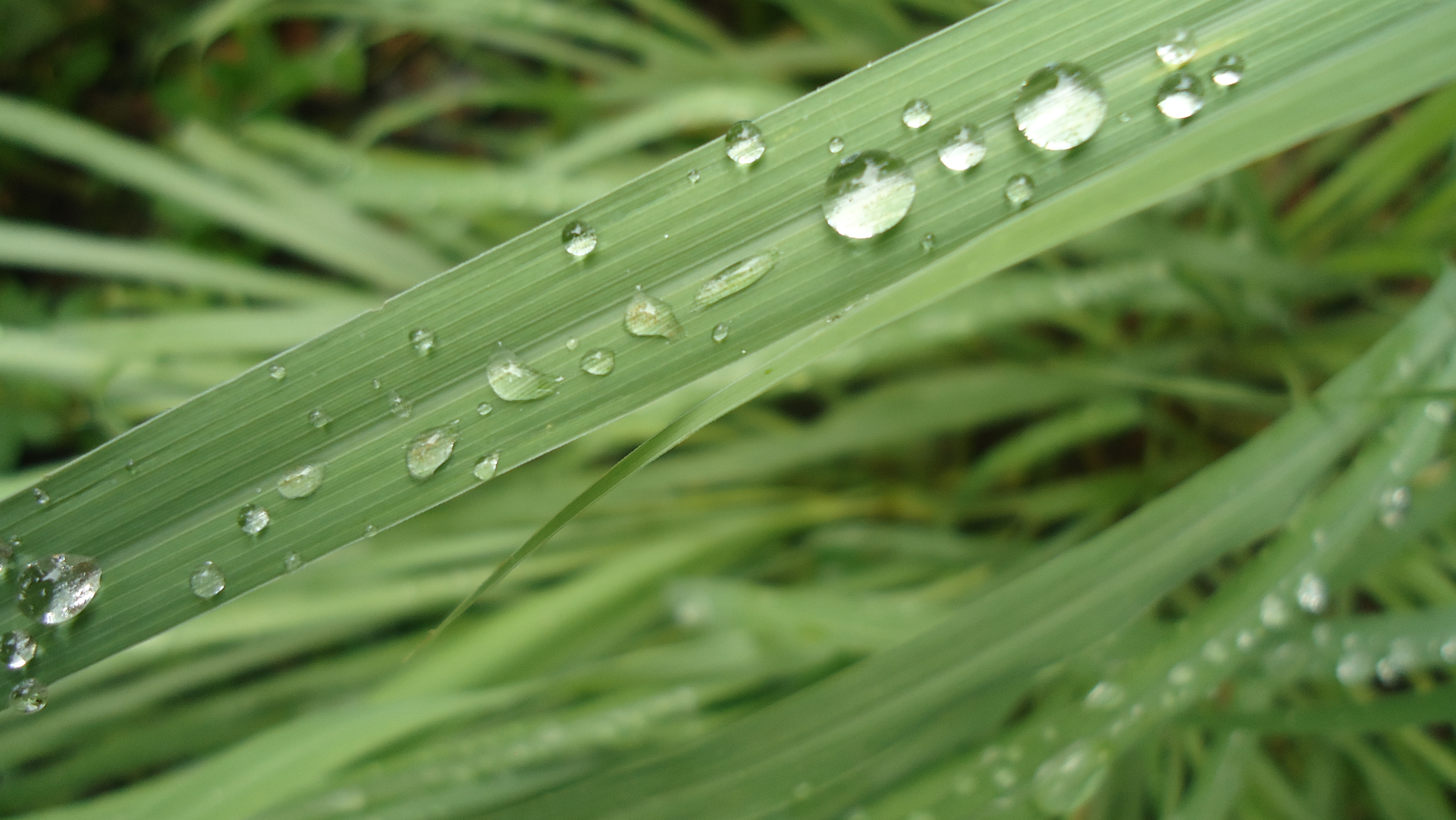
C. citratus from the Philippines, where it is locally known as tanglad

East Indian lemongrass (Cymbopogon flexuosus), also called Cochin grass or Malabar grass, is native to Cambodia, Vietnam, Laos, India, Sri Lanka, Myanmar, and Thailand, while West Indian lemongrass (Cymbopogon citratus) is native to maritime Southeast Asia. While both can be used interchangeably, C. citratus is more suitable for cooking. Lemongrass oil has a "fresh, sweet, lemon, grassy, green,... citrus" aroma.

=== Folk medicine ===
In India, C. citratus is used as a medical herb and in perfumes. C. citratus is consumed as a tea for anxiety in Brazilian folk medicine, but a study in humans found no effect. The tea caused a recurrence of contact dermatitis in one case. Samoans and Tongans use mashed C. citratus (called moegalo and moengālō respectively) leaves as a traditional remedy for oral infections.

=== FDA classification ===
Lemongrass essential oil has been declared generally recognized as safe in food by the United States Food and Drug Administration.

==== Folk magic ====
In Hoodoo, lemongrass is the primary ingredient of van van oil, one of the most popular oils used in conjure. Lemongrass is used in this preparation and on its own in hoodoo to protect against evil, spiritually clean a house, and to bring good luck in love affairs.

=== Insect ===
In beekeeping, lemongrass oil imitates the pheromone emitted by a honeybee's Nasonov gland to attract bees to a hive or a swarm.

== Species ==
Species in the genus currently number 52 and include:

- Cymbopogon ambiguus (Australian lemon-scented grass) – Australia, Timor
- Cymbopogon annamensis – Yunnan, Laos, Vietnam, Thailand
- Cymbopogon bhutanicus – Bhutan
- Cymbopogon bombycinus silky oilgrass – Australia
- Cymbopogon caesius – Sub-Saharan Africa, Indian Subcontinent, Yemen, Afghanistan, Madagascar, Comoros, Réunion
- Cymbopogon calcicola – Thailand, Kedah
- Cymbopogon calciphilus – Thailand
- Cymbopogon cambogiensis – Thailand, Cambodia, Vietnam
- Cymbopogon citratus (lemon grass or West Indian lemon grass) – Indonesia, Malaysia, Brunei, Philippines
- Cymbopogon clandestinus – Thailand, Myanmar, Andaman Islands
- Cymbopogon coloratus – Madhya Pradesh, Tamil Nadu, Myanmar, Vietnam
- Cymbopogon commutatus – Sahel, East Africa, Arabian Peninsula, Iraq, Iran, Afghanistan, India, Pakistan
- Cymbopogon densiflorus – central + south-central Africa
- Cymbopogon dependens – Australia
- Cymbopogon dieterlenii – Lesotho, Namibia, South Africa
- Cymbopogon distans – Gansu, Guizhou, Shaanxi, Sichuan, Tibet, Yunnan, Nepal, northern Pakistan, Jammu & Kashmir
- Cymbopogon exsertus – Nepal, Assam
- Cymbopogon flexuosus (East Indian lemon grass) – Indian Subcontinent, Indochina
- Cymbopogon gidarba – Indian Subcontinent, Myanmar, Yunnan
- Cymbopogon giganteus – Africa, Madagascar
- Cymbopogon globosus – Maluku, New Guinea, Queensland
- Cymbopogon goeringii – China, Korea, Japan incl Ryukyu Islands, Vietnam
- Cymbopogon gratus – Queensland
- Cymbopogon jwarancusa – Socotra, Turkey, Middle East, Arabian Peninsula, Iraq, Iran, Afghanistan, Indian Subcontinent, Tibet, Sichuan, Yunnan, Vietnam
- Cymbopogon khasianus – Yunnan, Guangxi, Assam, Bhutan, Bangladesh, Myanmar, Thailand
- Cymbopogon liangshanensis – Sichuan
- Cymbopogon mandalaiaensis – Myanmar
- Cymbopogon marginatus – Cape Province of South Africa
- Cymbopogon martini (palmarosa) – Indian Subcontinent, Myanmar, Vietnam
- Cymbopogon mekongensis – China, Indochina
- Cymbopogon microstachys Indian Subcontinent, Myanmar, Thailand, Yunnan
- Cymbopogon microthecus – Nepal, Bhutan, Assam, West Bengal, Bangladesh
- Cymbopogon minor – Yunnan
- Cymbopogon minutiflorus – Sulawesi
- Cymbopogon nardus (citronella grass) – Indian Subcontinent, Indochina, central + southern Africa, Madagascar, Seychelles
- Cymbopogon nervatus – Myanmar, Thailand, central Africa
- Cymbopogon obtectus Silky-heads – Australia
- Cymbopogon osmastonii – India, Bangladesh
- Cymbopogon pendulus – Yunnan, eastern Himalayas, Myanmar, Vietnam
- Cymbopogon polyneuros – Tamil Nadu, Sri Lanka, Myanmar
- Cymbopogon pospischilii – eastern + southern Africa, Oman, Yemen, Himalayas, Tibet, Yunnan
- Cymbopogon procerus – Australia, New Guinea, Maluku, Lesser Sunda Islands, Sulawesi
- Cymbopogon pruinosus – islands of Indian Ocean
- Cymbopogon queenslandicus – Queensland
- Cymbopogon quinhonensis – Vietnam
- Cymbopogon rectus – Lesser Sunda Islands, Java
- Cymbopogon refractus (barbed wire grass) – Australia incl Norfolk Island
- Cymbopogon schoenanthus (camel hay or camel grass) – Sahara, Sahel, eastern Africa, Arabian Peninsula, Iran
- Cymbopogon tortilis – China incl Taiwan, Ryukyu + Bonin Is, Philippines, Vietnam, Maluku
- Cymbopogon tungmaiensis – Sichuan, Tibet, Yunnan
- Cymbopogon winterianus (Java citronella, citronella grass) – Borneo, Java, Sumatra
- Cymbopogon xichangensis – Sichuan

Formerly included

Numerous species are now regarded as better suited to other genera, including Andropogon, Exotheca, Hyparrhenia, Iseilema, Schizachyrium, and Themeda.

== Images ==
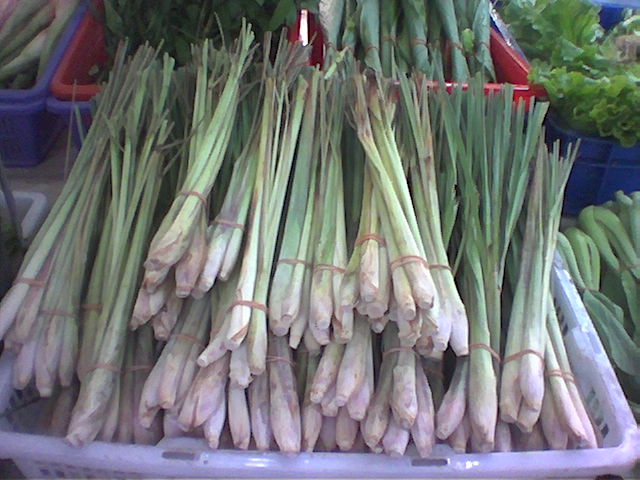
Lemongrass at a market

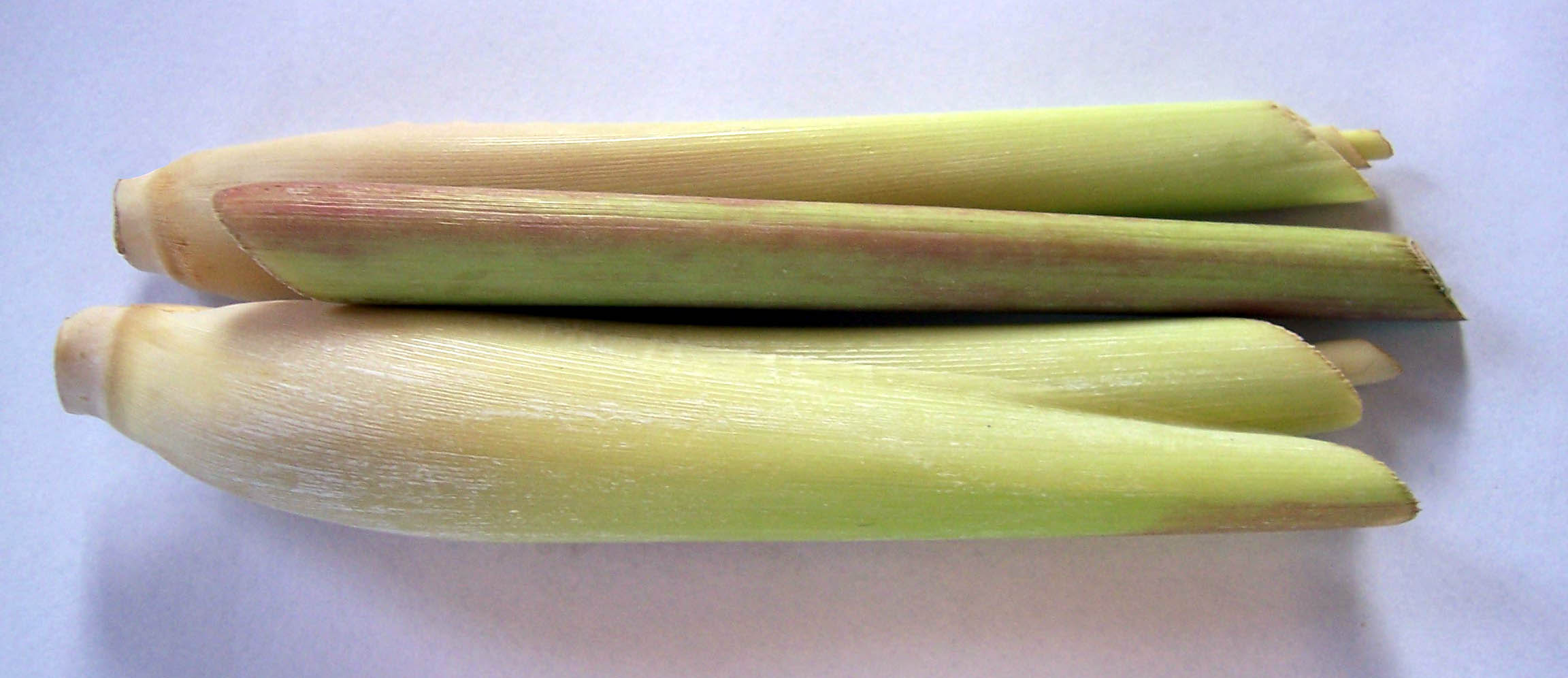
Prepared lemongrass

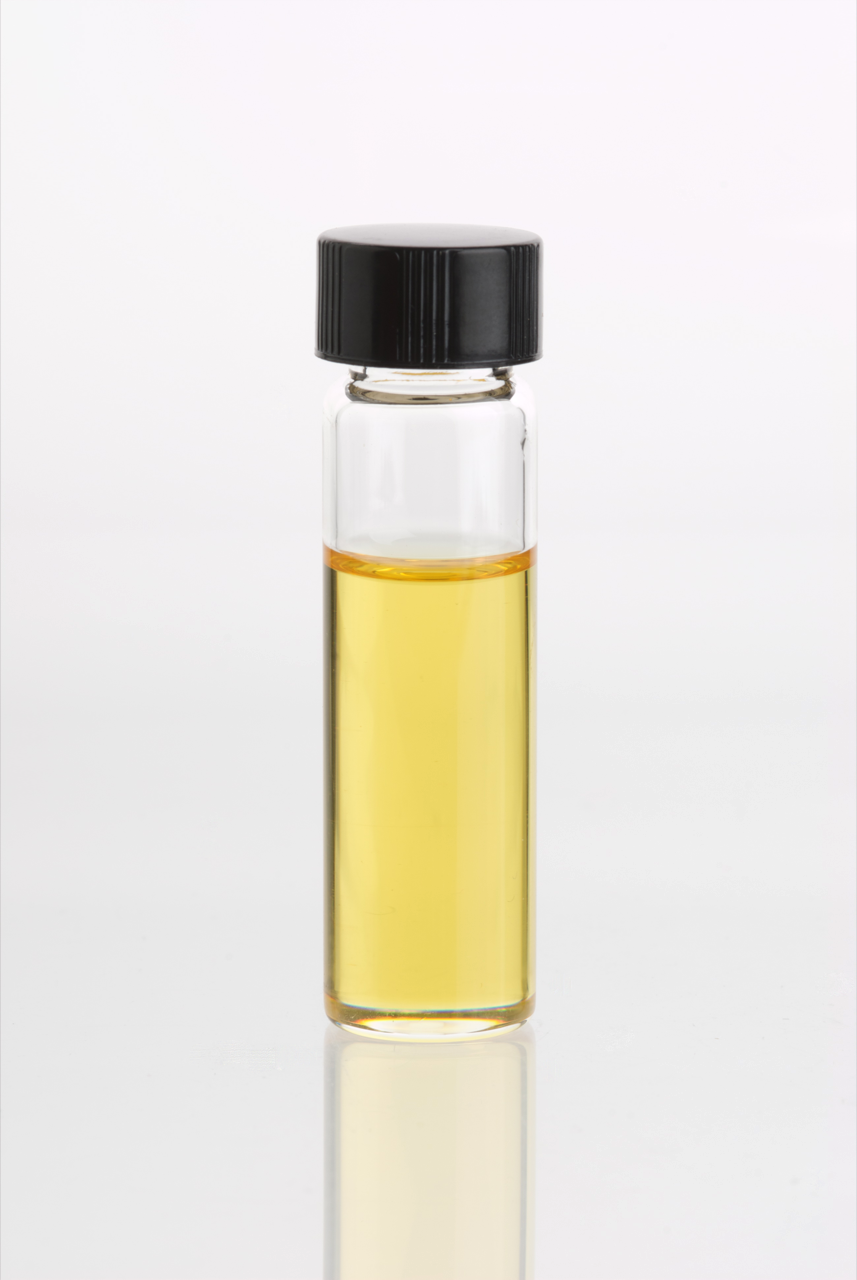
Lemongrass (Cymbopogon flexuosus) essential oil in clear glass vial

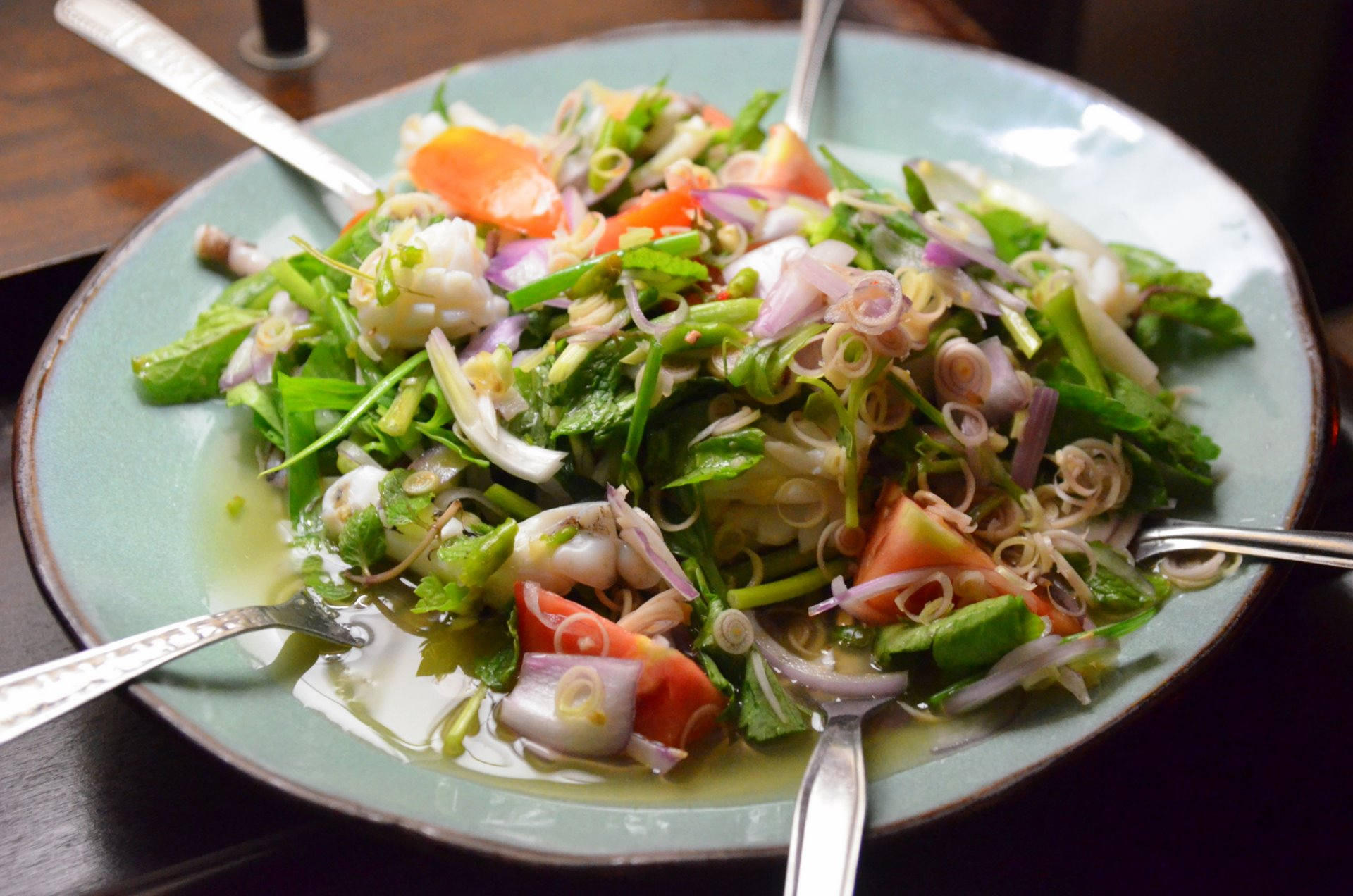
Thai yam takhrai kung sot (ยำตะไคร้กุ้งสด), a salad (yam) made with prawns and finely sliced fresh lemongrass

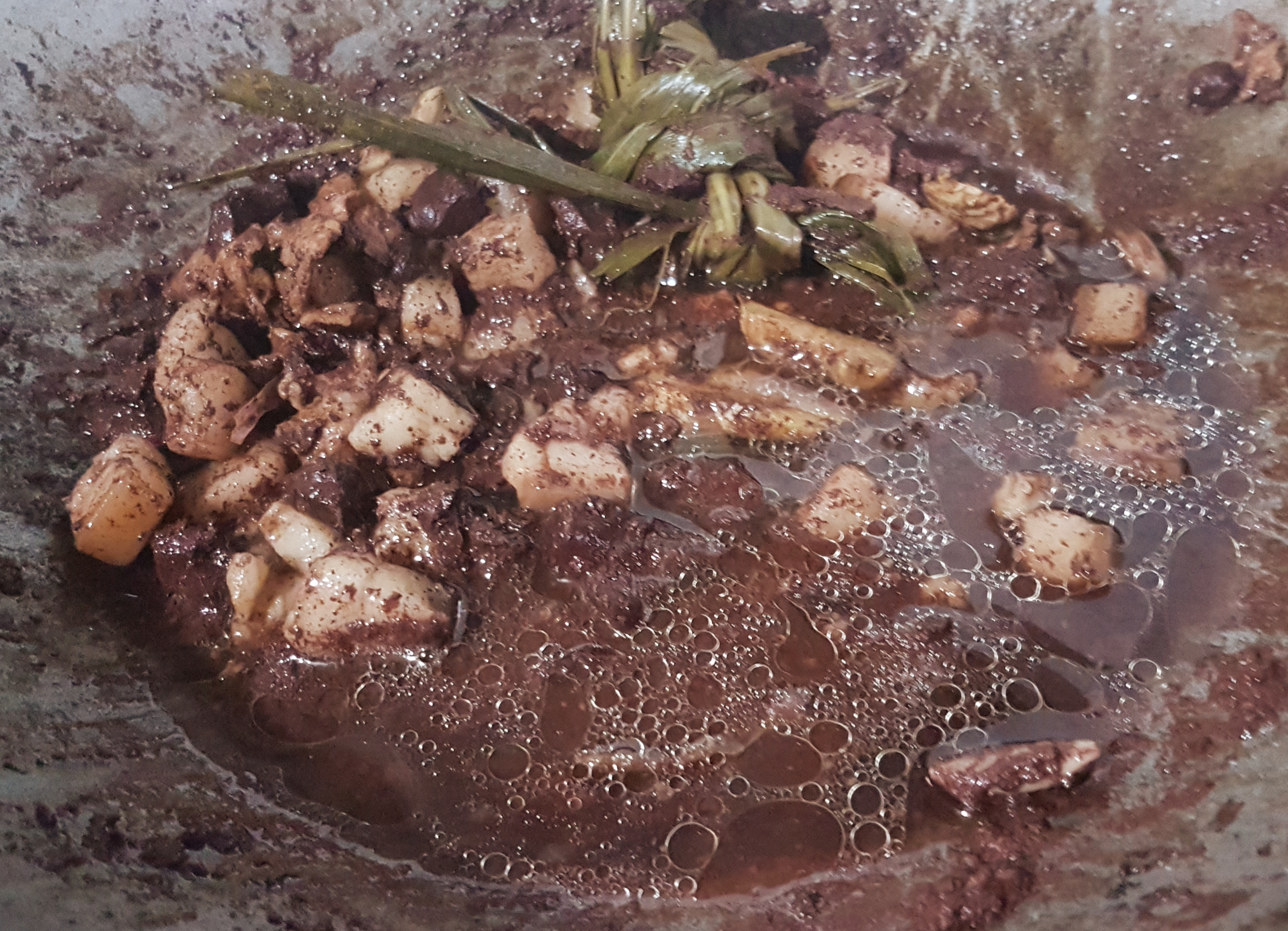
A knot of lemongrass used to impart fragrance in dinuguan (Filipino pork blood stew)

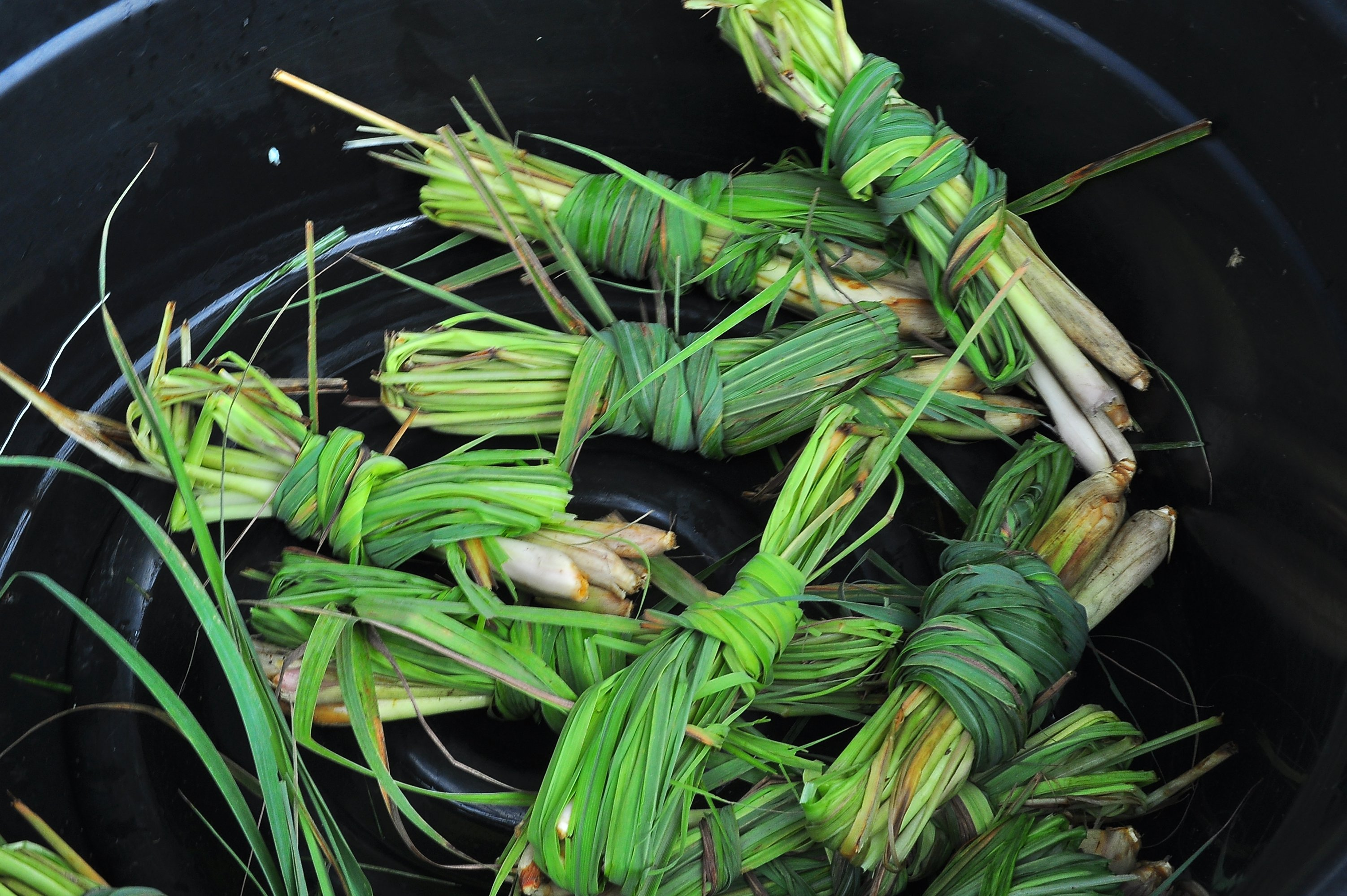
Knots of lemongrass ready for use in Filipino cuisine

== Bibliography ==
- Akhila, Anand (2010). Essential Oil-Bearing Grasses - The genus Cymbopogon. Boca Raton, FL: CRC Press. ISBN 978-0-8493-7857-7.
