= C5H8O =

The molecular formula C_{5}H_{8}O (molar mass: 84.12 g/mol) may refer to:

- Cyclopentanone
- 2,3-Dihydropyran
- trans-2-Methyl-2-butenal
- 2-Methylbut-3-yn-2-ol
- 3-Penten-2-one
