= Lemonal =

Lemonal may refer to:

- Lemonal, Belize, a village in Belize District, Belize
- Citral, a chemical with the molecular formula C_{10}H_{16}O
