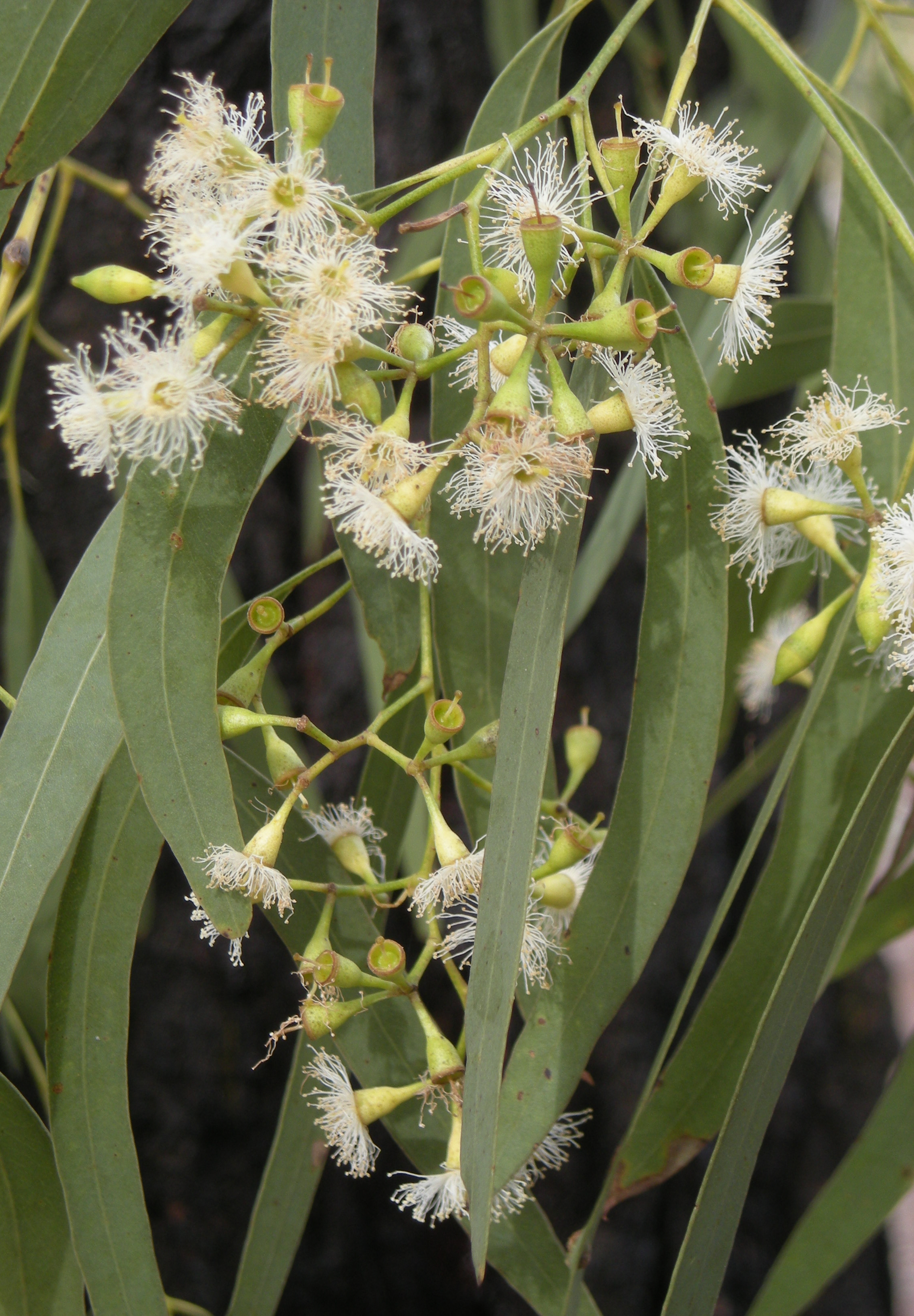

Conservation status
- Least Concern (IUCN 3.1)

Scientific classification
- Kingdom: Plantae
- Clade: Tracheophytes
- Clade: Angiosperms
- Clade: Eudicots
- Clade: Rosids
- Order: Myrtales
- Family: Myrtaceae
- Genus: Eucalyptus
- Species: E. crebra

Binomial name
- Eucalyptus crebra F. Muell.

Synonyms
- Synonyms: Callista Lour.; Eucalyptus crebra F.Muell. var. crebra; Metrosideros salicifolia Sol. ex Gaertn.; Eucalyptus drepanophylla F.Muell. ex Benth.; Eucalyptus drepanophylla F.Muell. ex Benth. var. drepanophylla; Eucalyptus crebra var. macrocarpa Domin; Eucalyptus racemosa var. macrocarpa (Domin) Blakely; Eucalyptus xanthoclada Brooker & A.R.Bean; Eucalyptus sp. Texas (K.M.Sparshott+ KMS488); Eucalyptus sp. Stannary Hills (G.W.Althofer 402); Eucalyptus sp. St Lawrence (N.H.Speck 1745); Eucalyptus sp. Scartwater (L.Pedley X6404); Eucalyptus sp. Rossmoya (N.H.Speck 1757); Eucalyptus sp. Pentland (M.I.H.Brooker 8968); Eucalyptus sp. Mutchilba (B.Hyland 5060); Eucalyptus sp. Mt Surprise (M.I.H.Brooker 3409); Eucalyptus sp. Jimboomba (A.R.Bean 7772); Eucalyptus sp. Irvinebank (L.Pedley 1921); Eucalyptus sp. Gregory Springs (A.R.Bean 1074); Eucalyptus sp. Clermont (A.R.Bean 508); Eucalyptus sp. Caldervale (D.Jermyn AQ582304); Eucalyptus sp. Boynedale (M.I.H.Brooker 9767); Eucalyptus sp. Beerburrum (A.R.Bean 11657); Eucalyptus sp. Battle Camp (K.Hill+ 1086)

= Eucalyptus crebra =

Narrow-leaved ironbark

Species of eucalyptus

Eucalyptus crebra, commonly known as the narrow-leaved ironbark, narrow-leaved red ironbark or simply ironbark, and as muggago in the indigenous Dharawal language, is a species of small to medium-sized tree endemic to eastern Australia. It has hard, rough "ironbark" from its trunk to small branches, linear to lance-shaped adult leaves, flower buds in groups of seven, nine or eleven, white flowers and cup-shaped, barrel-shaped or hemispherical fruit. A variable species, it grows in woodland and forest from the Cape York Peninsula to near Sydney. It is an important source of nectar in the honey industry and its hard, strong timber is used in construction.

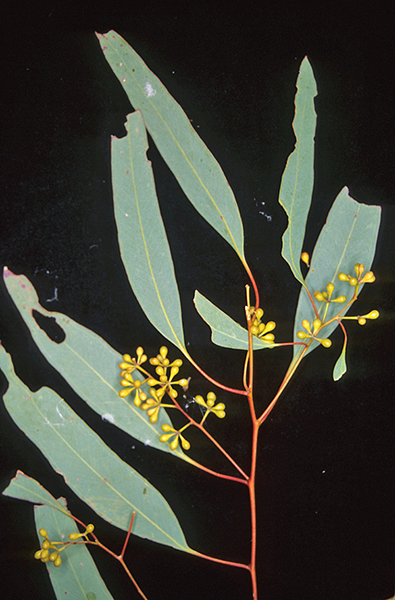
Flower buds

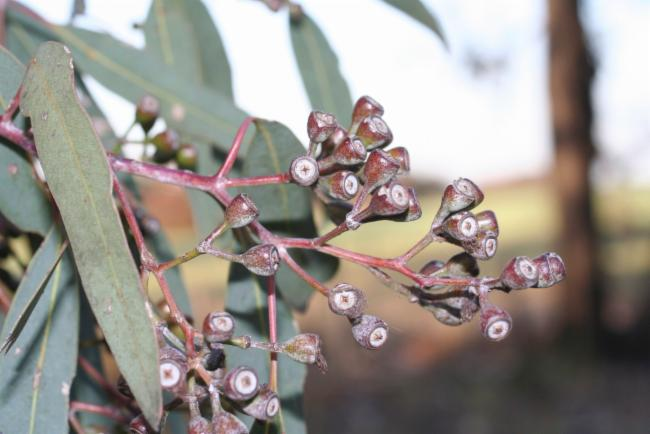
Fruit

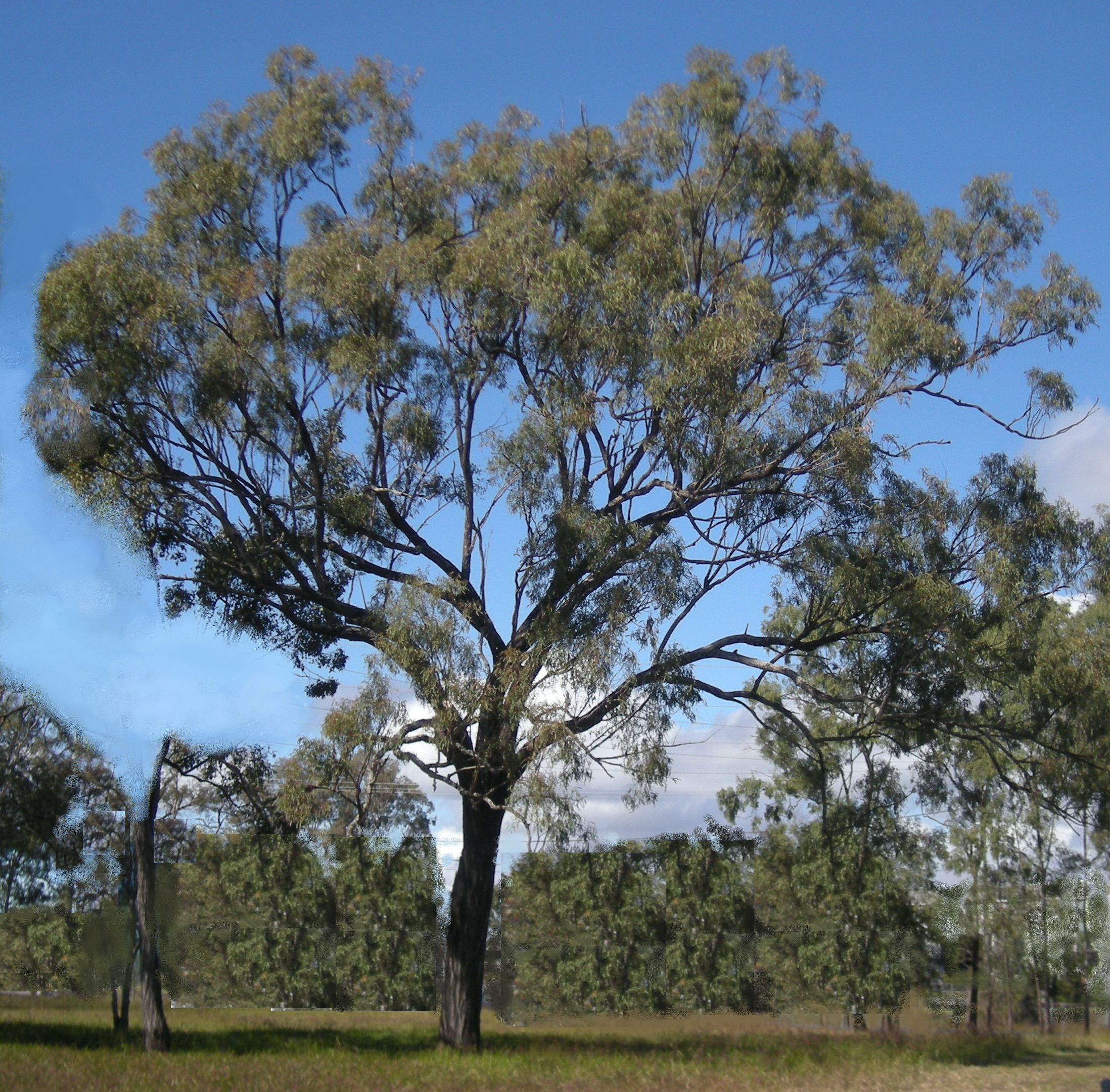
Habit in coastal Central Queensland.

== Description ==
Eucalyptus crebra is a tree that typically grows to a height of 35 m (115 ft) and forms a lignotuber. It has persistent thick, rough, deeply furrowed, greyish black "ironbark" from the base of its trunk to the small branches. Young plants and coppice regrowth have linear to lance-shaped or curved leaves 50–120 mm (2.0–4.7 in) long and 6–17 mm (0.24–0.67 in) wide. Adult leaves are linear to lance-shaped, the same dull green to greyish colour on both sides, 55–180 mm (2.2–7.1 in) long and 7–27 mm (0.28–1.06 in) wide on a petiole 7–20 mm (0.28–0.79 in) long. The flower buds are arranged in groups of seven, nine or eleven, usually on a branching inflorescence on the ends of branchlets. Each group is carried on a peduncle 2–13 mm (0.079–0.512 in) long, the individual buds on a pedicel 2–7 mm (0.079–0.276 in) long. Mature buds are club-shaped, spindle-shaped, or diamond-shaped to oval, 3–7 mm (0.12–0.28 in) long and 2–4 mm (0.079–0.157 in) wide and green to yellow with a conical to rounded operculum. Flowering has been recorded in most months and the flowers are white. The fruit is a woody cup-shaped, barrel-shaped or hemispherical capsule 2–7 mm (0.079–0.276 in) long and 2.5–6 mm (0.098–0.236 in) wide on a pedicel 1–6 mm (0.039–0.236 in) long.

== Taxonomy and naming ==
Eucalyptus crebra was first formally described in Journal and Proceedings of the Linnean Society, Botany by Victorian state botanist Ferdinand von Mueller in 1859. The specific epithet is the Latin adjective crebra meaning "thick", "close" or "numerous", referring to the species' abundance.

Narrow-leaved ironbark has included several species, including E. drepanophylla and E. xanthoclada but these are regarded as synonyms by the Australian Plant Census. Eucalyptus repanophylla is accepted as a separate species by the Queensland Government. Other similar species include E. exilipes, E. granitica, E. staigeriana, E. quadricostata and E. whitei.

== Distribution and habitat ==
The narrow-leaved ironbark grows in sandy soils in woodland and forest from Picton, southwest of Sydney, north through New South Wales and Queensland to the vicinity of Moreton Telegraph Station on Cape York Peninsula.

== Uses ==
The tree has a hard, strong, and dark red timber, which has been used for sleepers and construction. A plank has been recorded as being used for Elizabeth Farm, Australia's oldest surviving European dwelling. It is used as a shade tree or to line roadways, and is also available as a cultivar. It is useful in honey production as the flowers are heavy in nectar and pollen; the resulting honey produced by bees is light-coloured and delicately flavoured.

== Gallery ==
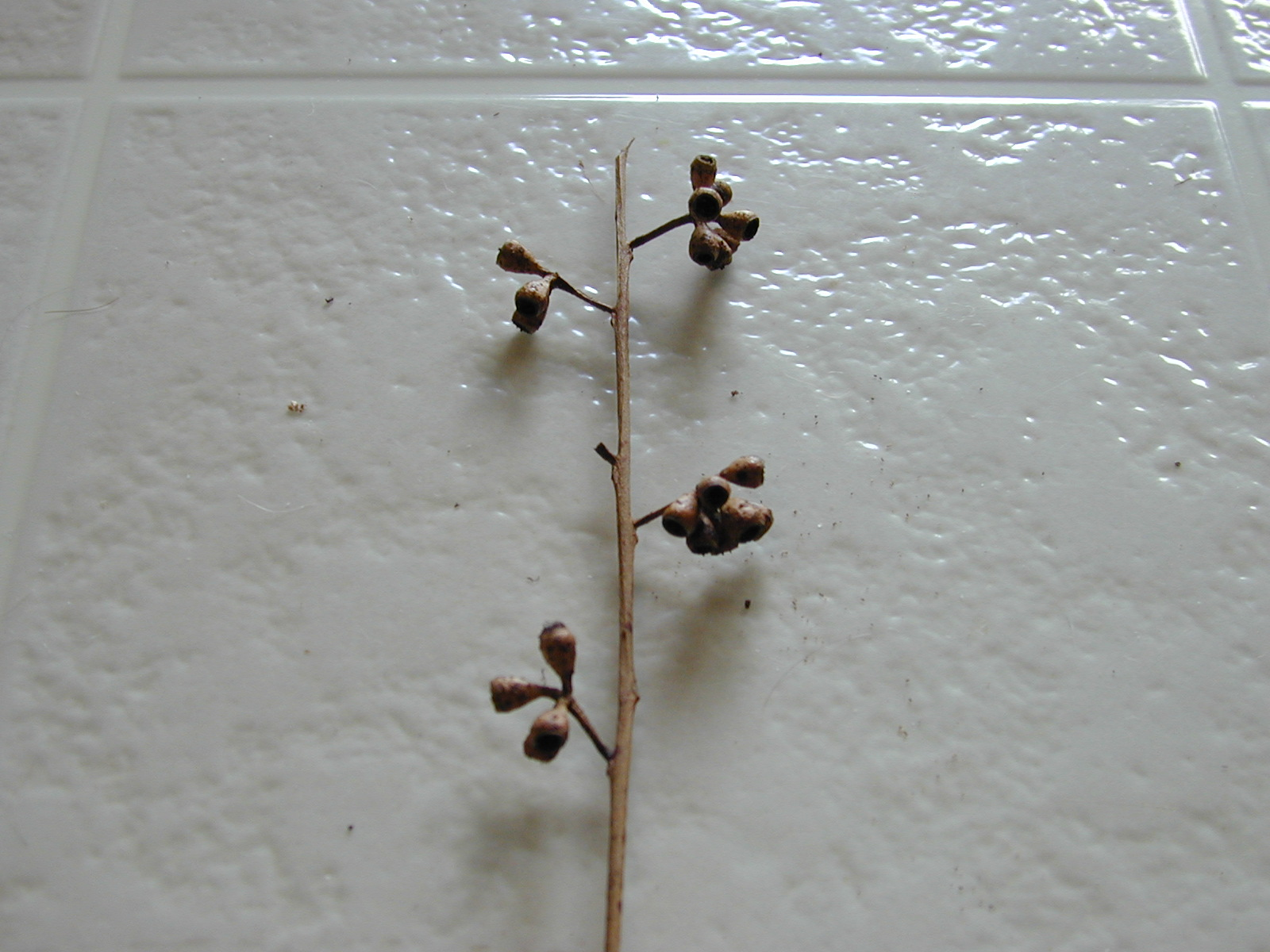
E. crebra open capsules.

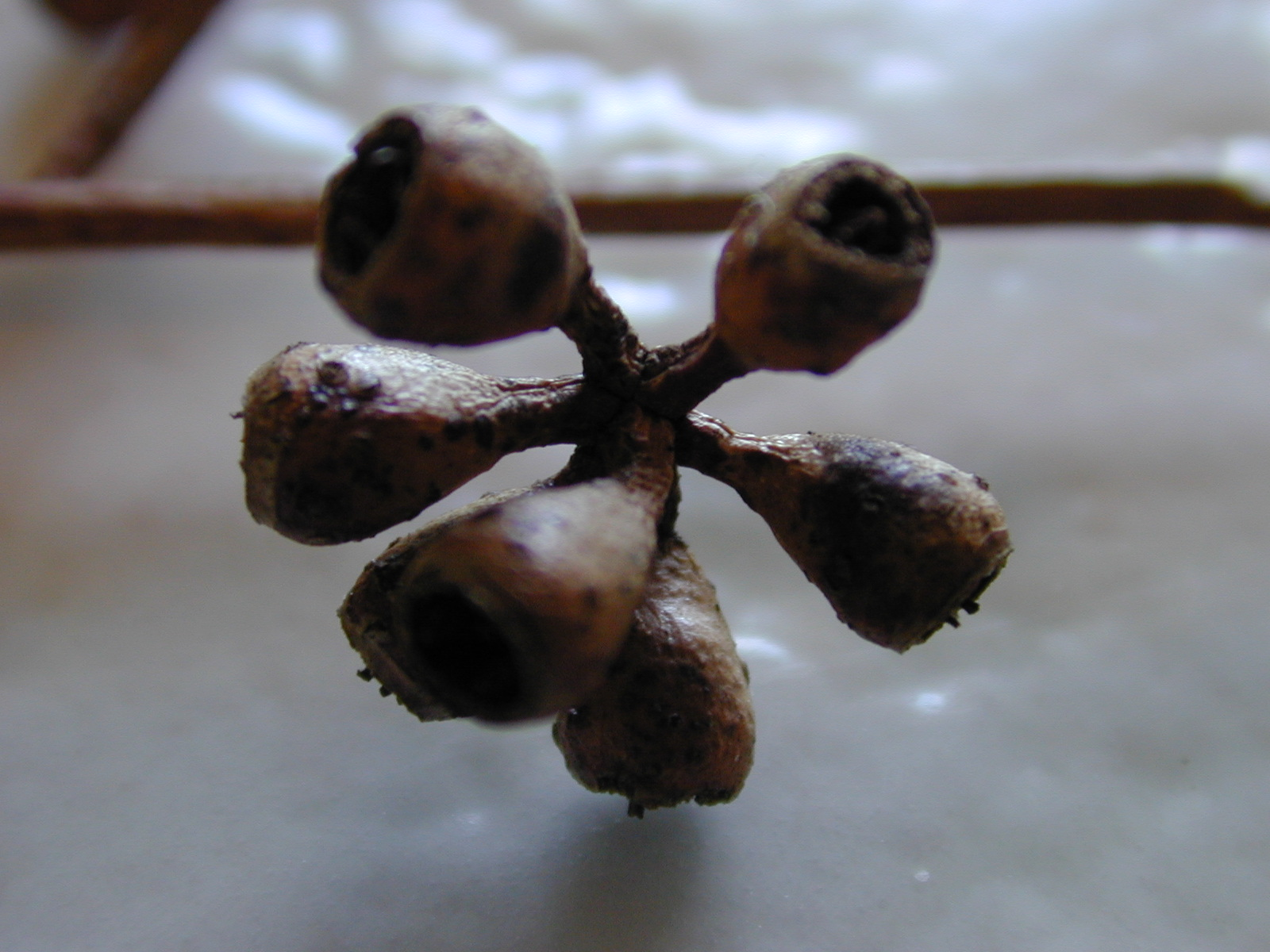
E. crebra open capsules.

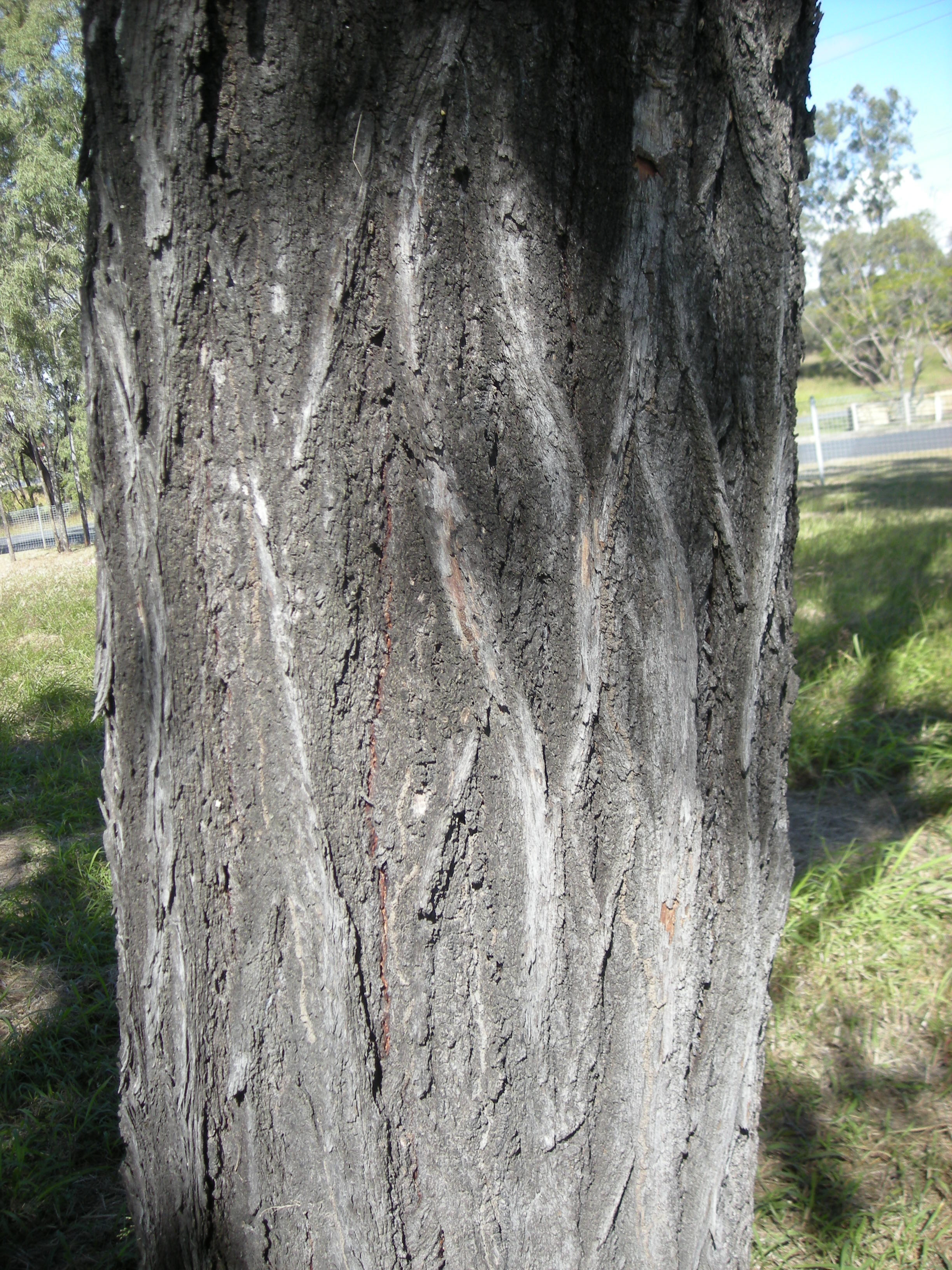
E. crebra bark
