= Geraniol dehydrogenase =

geraniol dehydrogenase

Identifiers
- EC no.: 1.1.1.183
- CAS no.: 56802-96-1

Databases
- IntEnz: IntEnz view
- BRENDA: BRENDA entry
- ExPASy: NiceZyme view
- KEGG: KEGG entry
- MetaCyc: metabolic pathway
- PRIAM: profile
- PDB structures: RCSB PDB PDBe PDBsum
- Gene Ontology: AmiGO / QuickGO
Search
- PMC: articles
- PubMed: articles
- NCBI: proteins

In enzymology, a geraniol dehydrogenase (EC 1.1.1.183) is an enzyme that catalyzes the chemical reaction

geraniol
+ NADP^{+}
H^{+}
H^{+}
geranial
+ NADPH

The two substrates of this enzyme are geraniol and oxidised nicotinamide adenine dinucleotide phosphate (NADP^{+}). Its products are geranial, reduced NADPH, and a proton.

This enzyme belongs to the family of oxidoreductases, specifically those acting on the CH-OH group of donor with NAD^{+} or NADP^{+} as acceptor. The systematic name of this enzyme class is geraniol:NADP^{+} oxidoreductase.
