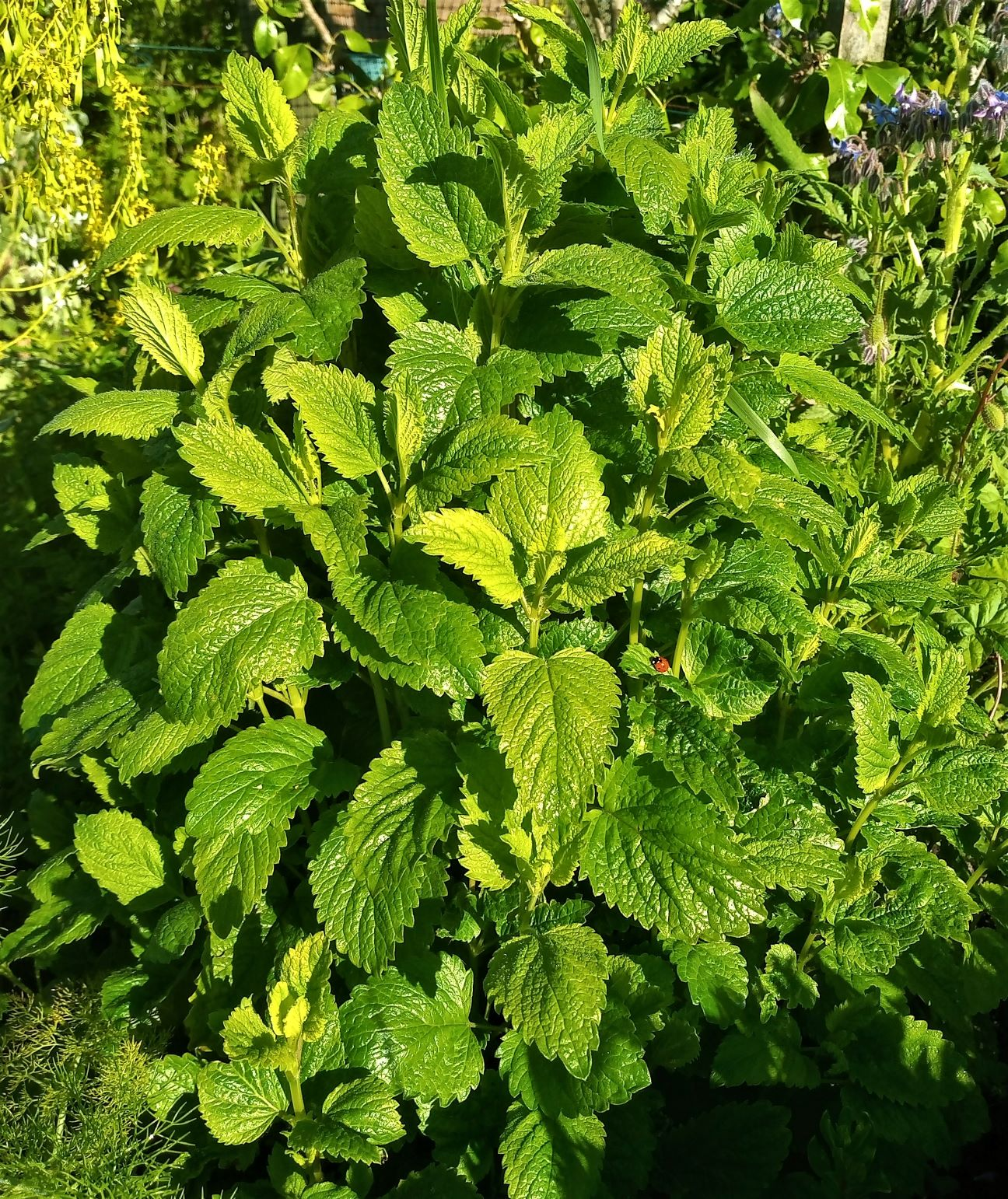

Conservation status
- Least Concern (IUCN 3.1)

Scientific classification
- Kingdom: Plantae
- Clade: Tracheophytes
- Clade: Angiosperms
- Clade: Eudicots
- Clade: Asterids
- Order: Lamiales
- Family: Lamiaceae
- Genus: Melissa
- Species: M. officinalis

Binomial name
- Melissa officinalis L.

= Lemon balm =

Species of plant

Lemon balm (Melissa officinalis) (Note: Other names for lemon balm include sweet balm, balm, common balm, melissa balm, and balm mint.) is a perennial herbaceous plant in the mint family. It has lemon-scented leaves, white or pale pink flowers, and contains essential oils and compounds, such as geranial and neral.

It grows to a maximum height of 1 m (3 1/2 ft). The species is native to south-central Europe, the Mediterranean, Central Asia, and Iran. It is naturalized worldwide. It grows easily from seed in rich, moist soil.

The genus name Melissa comes from the Ancient Greek word μέλισσα (mélissa, 'honey bee'), due to the plant's bee-attracting flowers. The epithet from Latin officinalis refers to its traditional use in apothecaries. It has been cultivated (and used to attract honey bees) since at least the 16th century. It is used as an ornamental plant, as a raw or cooked herb in various foods, and in teas, and aromatic essential oils.

== Description ==
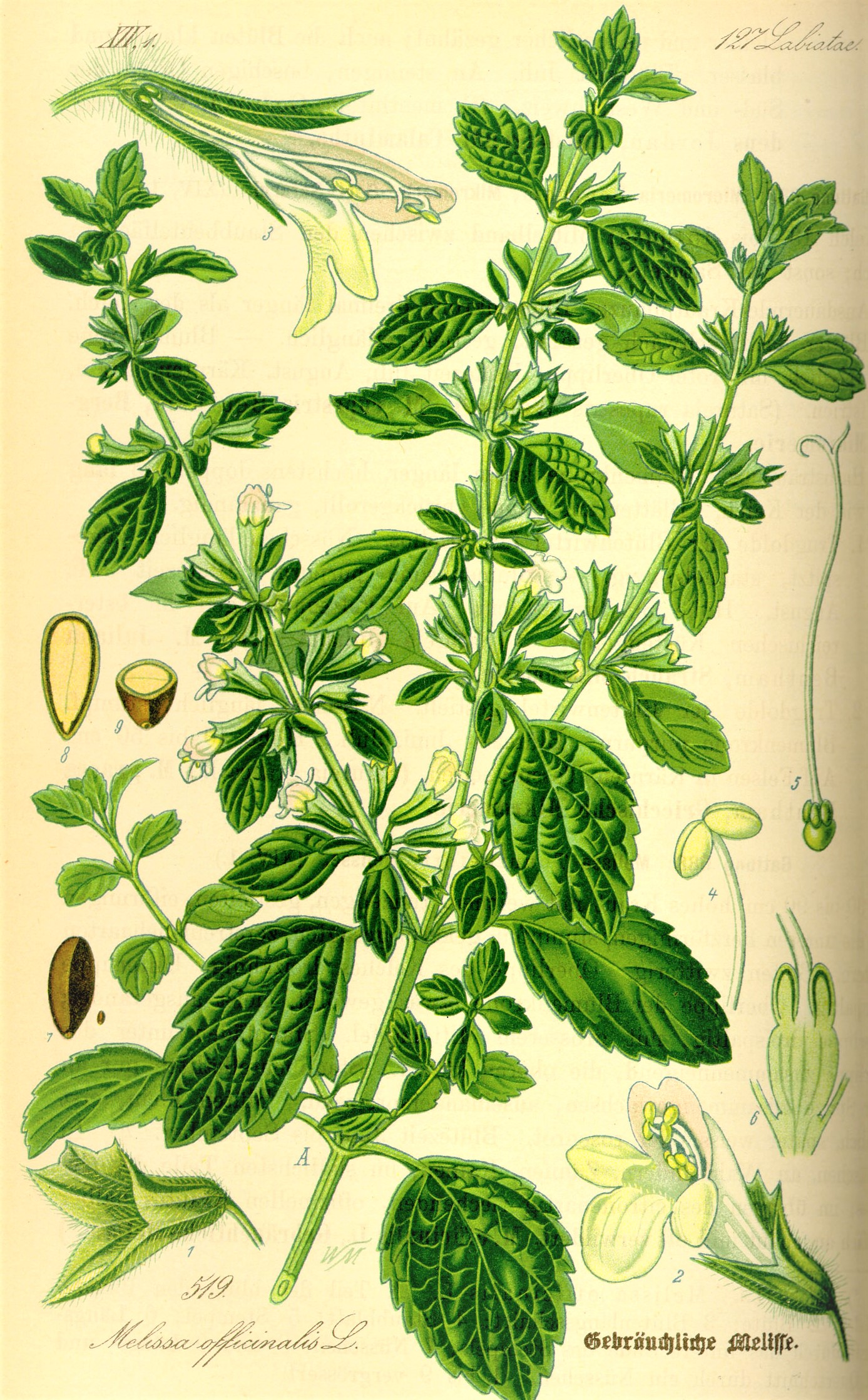
1885 illustration

Lemon balm (Melissa officinalis) is a perennial herbaceous plant in the mint family, Lamiaceae. Lemon balm grows vigorously from seed or vegetative fragments in temperate zones. Key producing countries such as Hungary, Egypt, Ireland, and Italy cultivate a variety of cultivars for hand-harvested leaves and low-yield essential oils.

Lemon balm plants grow bushy and upright to a maximum height of 100 centimetres (39 in). The heart-shaped leaves are 2–8 cm (3/4–3 1/4 in) long, and have a rough, veined surface. They are soft and hairy with scalloped edges, and have a mild lemon scent. During summer, small white or pale pink flowers appear. The plants live for ten years; the crop plant is replaced after five years to allow the ground to rejuvenate.

=== Chemistry ===
Lemon balm contains eugenol, tannins, and terpenes.

Composition of oil
Component	minimum %	maximum %
Methyl Heptenone	2.2	8.6
Citronellal	1.0	8.4
Linalool	0.5	2.7
Neral	19.6	36.1
Geranial	25.3	47.5
Geranyl acetate	1.2	6.2
Carophyllene	1.9	9.7
Carophyllene oxide	0.5	9.0

== Etymology ==
The white flowers attract bees, hence the genus Melissa (Greek for "honey bee"). It is not to be confused with bee balm (genus Monarda).

The second name, officinalis (Latin, 'of the shop'), originates from the use of the herb by apothecaries, who sold herbal remedies directly to their customers.

== Distribution and habitat ==
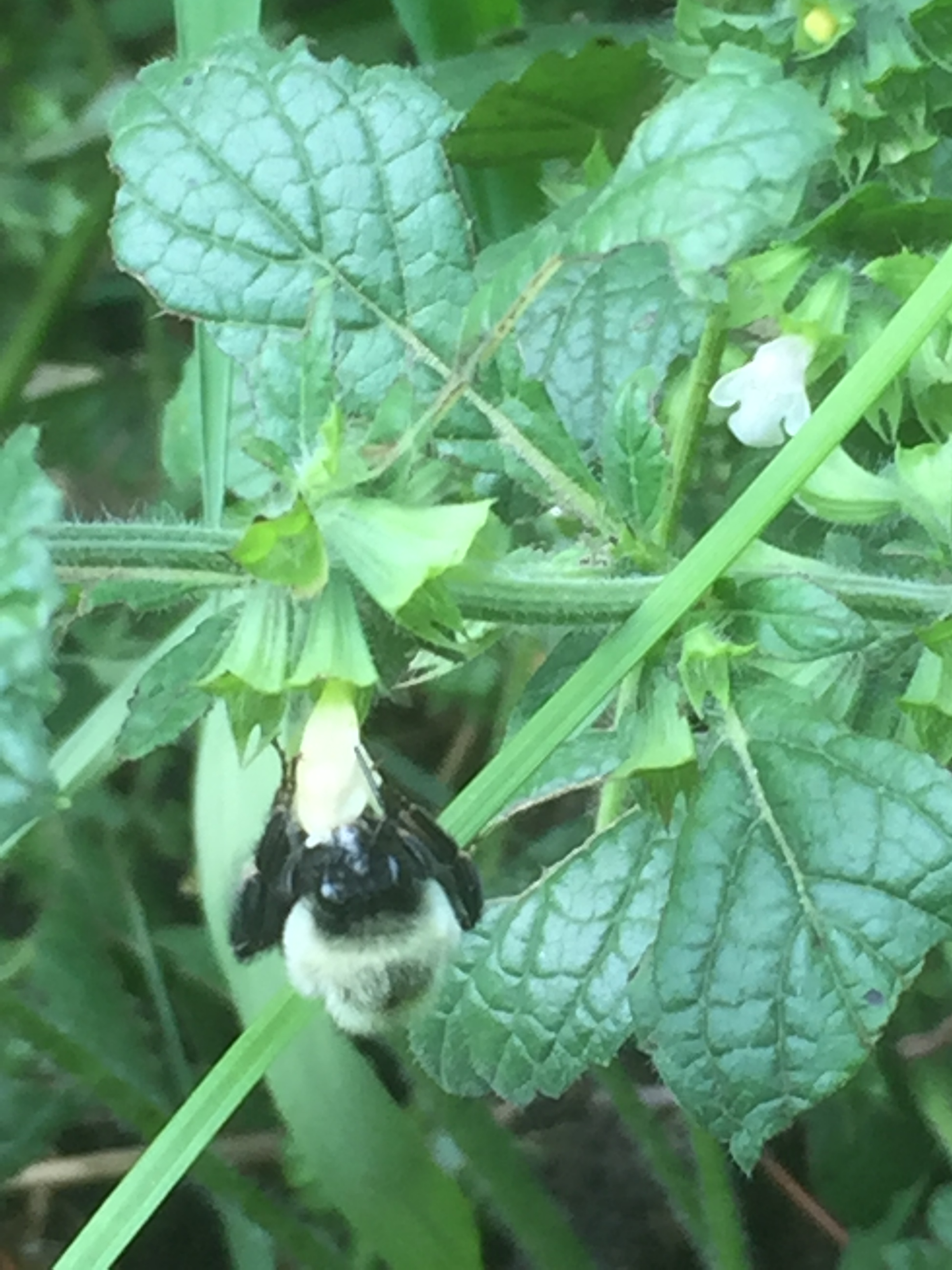
A bumblebee feeding on a lemon balm flower

Melissa officinalis is native to south-central Europe, the Mediterranean Basin, Central Asia and Iran, but is now naturalized in the Americas and elsewhere around the world. It grows easily from seed, preferring rich, moist soil.

== Cultivation ==
Lemon balm seeds requires light and a minimum temperature of 20 °C (68 °F) to germinate. The plant grows in clumps and spreads vegetatively (a new plant growing from a fragment of its parent), as well as by seed. In mild temperate zones, the plant stems die off at the start of winter, but shoot up again in spring. Lemon balm grows vigorously.

As of 1992, Hungary, Egypt, and Italy are the major producing countries of lemon balm. The leaves are harvested by hand in June and August in the northern hemisphere, on a day when the weather is dry, to prevent the crop from turning black if damp.

The cultivars of M. officinalis include:

- M. officinalis 'Citronella'
- M. officinalis 'Lemonella'
- M. officinalis 'Quedlinburger'
- M. officinalis 'Lime'
- M. officinalis 'Mandarina'
- M. officinalis 'Variegata'
- M. officinalis 'Aurea'
- M. officinalis 'Quedlinburger Niederliegende', a variety reportedly bred for higher essential oil content.

=== Essential oil production ===
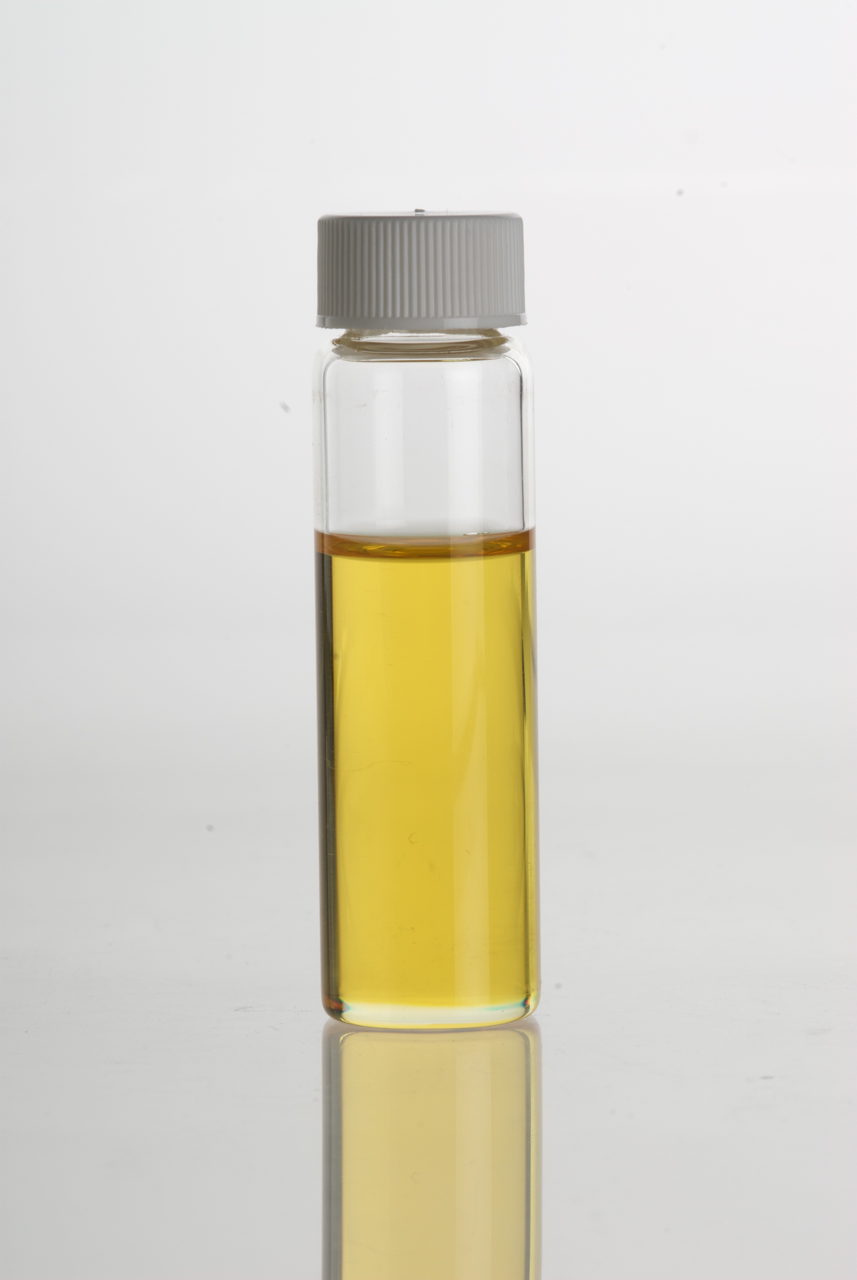
Essential oil

Ireland is a major producer of lemon balm essential oil, which has a pale yellow colour and a lemon scent. The essential oil is commonly co-distilled with lemon oil, citronella oil or other essential oils. Yields are low; 0.014% for fresh leaves and 0.112% for dried leaves.

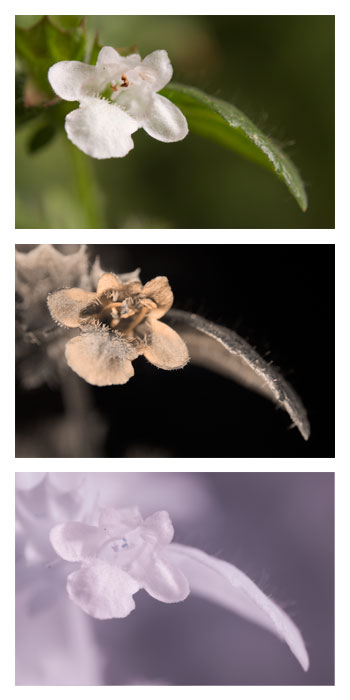
The plant seen in visible light, ultraviolet light and infrared

== Uses ==
Lemon balm is used as a flavouring in ice cream and herbal teas, often in combination with other herbs, such as spearmint. The leaves can be used in fish dishes and lemon balm pesto.

== In history ==
The use of lemon balm can be dated to over 2,000 years ago through the Greeks and the Romans. It is mentioned by the Greek polymath Theophrastus in his Historia Plantarum, written in c.300 BC, as "bee-leaf" (μελισσόφυλλον). Lemon balm was formally introduced into Europe in the 7th century, from which its use and domestication spread. Its use in the Middle Ages is noted by herbalists, writers, philosophers, and scientists.

Lemon balm was a favourite plant of the Tudors, who scattered the leaves across their floors. It was in the herbal garden of the English botanist John Gerard in the 1590s, who considered it especially good for feeding and attracting honey bees. Especially cultivated for honey production, according to the authors Janet Dampney and Elizabeth Pomeroy, "bees were thought never to leave a garden in which it was grown". It was introduced to North America by the first colonists from Europe; it was cultivated in the Gardens of Monticello, designed by the American statesman Thomas Jefferson.

The English botanist Nicholas Culpeper considered lemon balm to be ruled by the planet Jupiter in Cancer, and suggested it to be used for "weak stomachs", to cause the heart to become "merry", to help digestion, to open "obstructions of the brain", and to expel "melancholy vapors" from the heart and arteries. 'Balm water' or 'Aqua Melissa' was used as a healthy beverage from the 18th century.
