= Cubeba =

Cubeba may refer to:

- Cubeb, Piper cubeba a plant in genus Piper
- West African Pepper, Piper guineense another plant in genus Piper
- Litsea cubeba, May Chang a plant in genus Litsea
