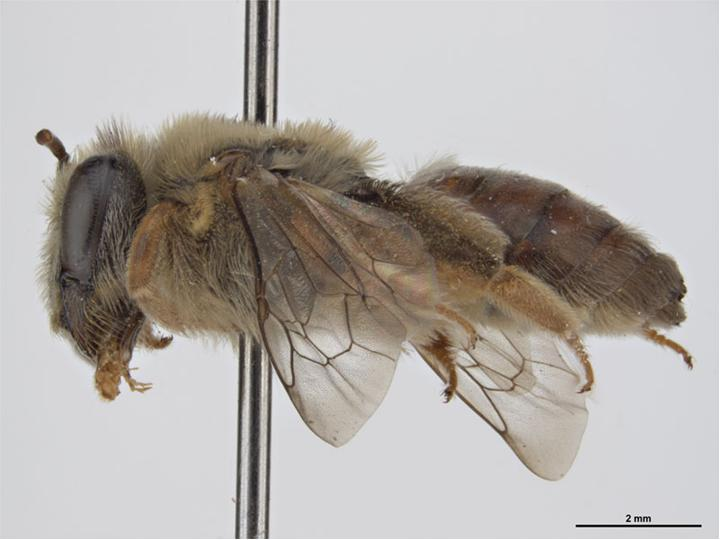
- Female

Scientific classification
- Kingdom: Animalia
- Phylum: Arthropoda
- Clade: Pancrustacea
- Class: Insecta
- Order: Hymenoptera
- Family: Colletidae
- Genus: Leioproctus
- Species: L. fimbriatinus

Binomial name
- Leioproctus fimbriatinus (Cockerell, 1910)

Synonyms
- Paracolletes fimbriatinus Cockerell, 1910

= Leioproctus fimbriatinus =

Species of bee

Leioproctus fimbriatinus, or Leioproctus (Goniocolletes) fimbriatinus, is a species of bee in the family Colletidae and subfamily Colletinae. It is endemic to Australia. It was described by British-American entomologist Theodore Dru Alison Cockerell in 1910.

== Distribution and habitat ==
The species occurs in eastern Australia. The type locality is Ararat, Victoria.

== Behaviour ==
The adults are flying mellivores. Flowering plants visited by the bees include Eucalyptus crebra, Eucalyptus camaldulensis and Leptospermum species.

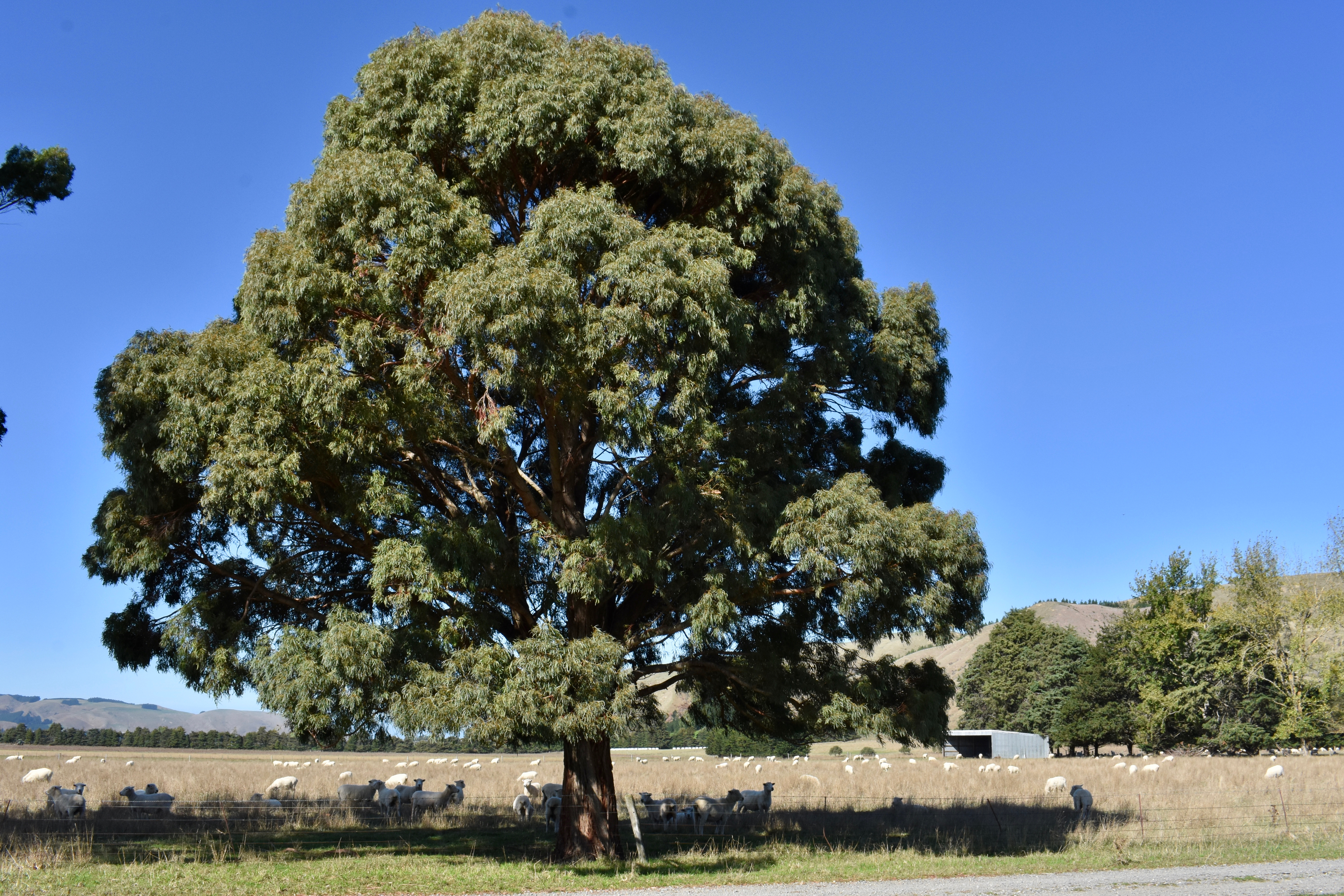
Eucalyptus crebra (narrow-leaved ironbark), a forage plant of the bees

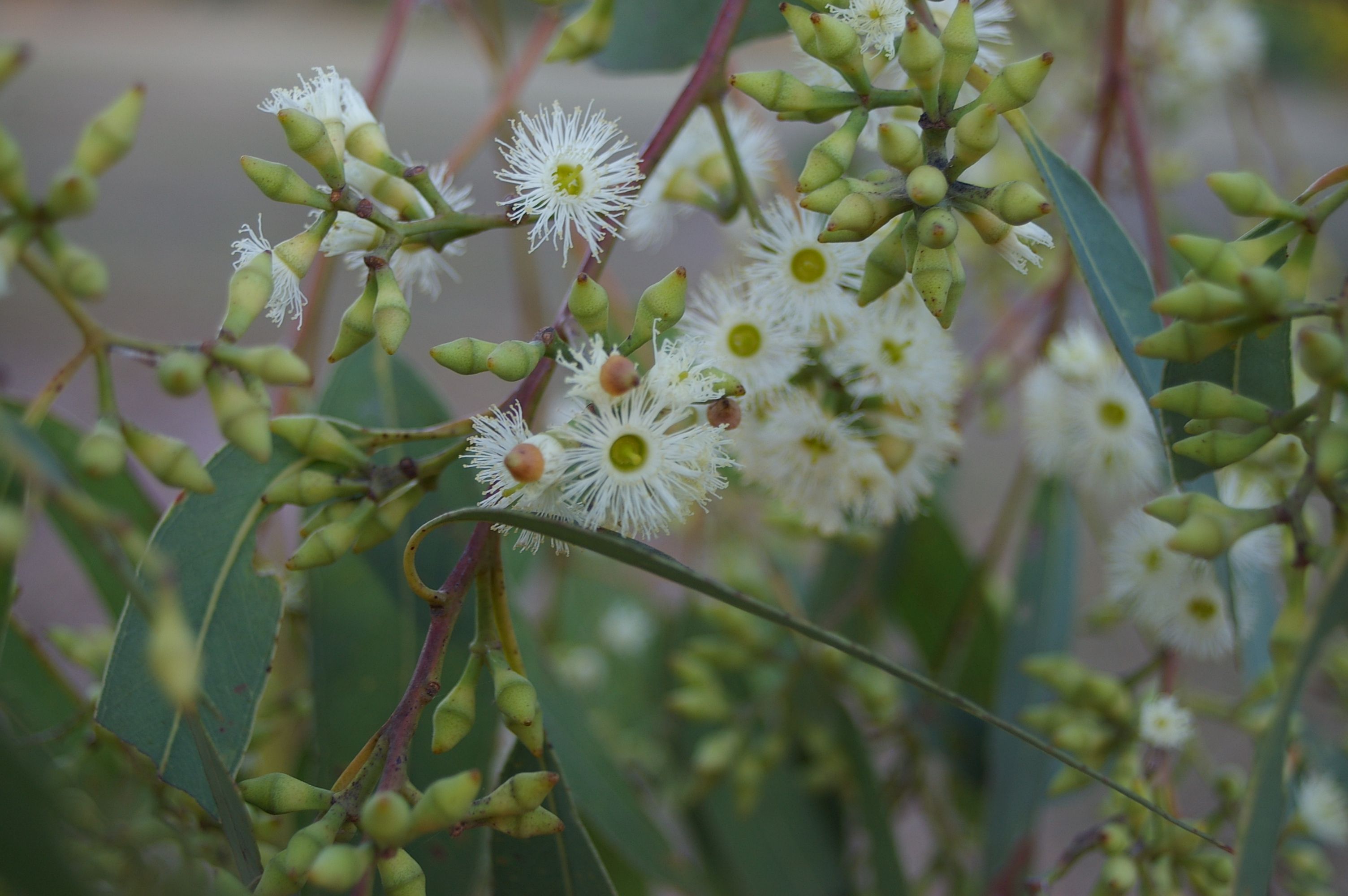
Eucalyptus crebra flowers
