= Methacrolein =

Chemical compound

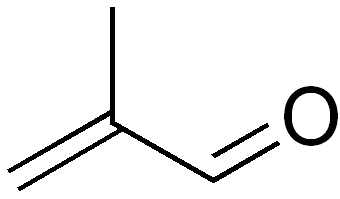
Skeletal formula of methacrolein
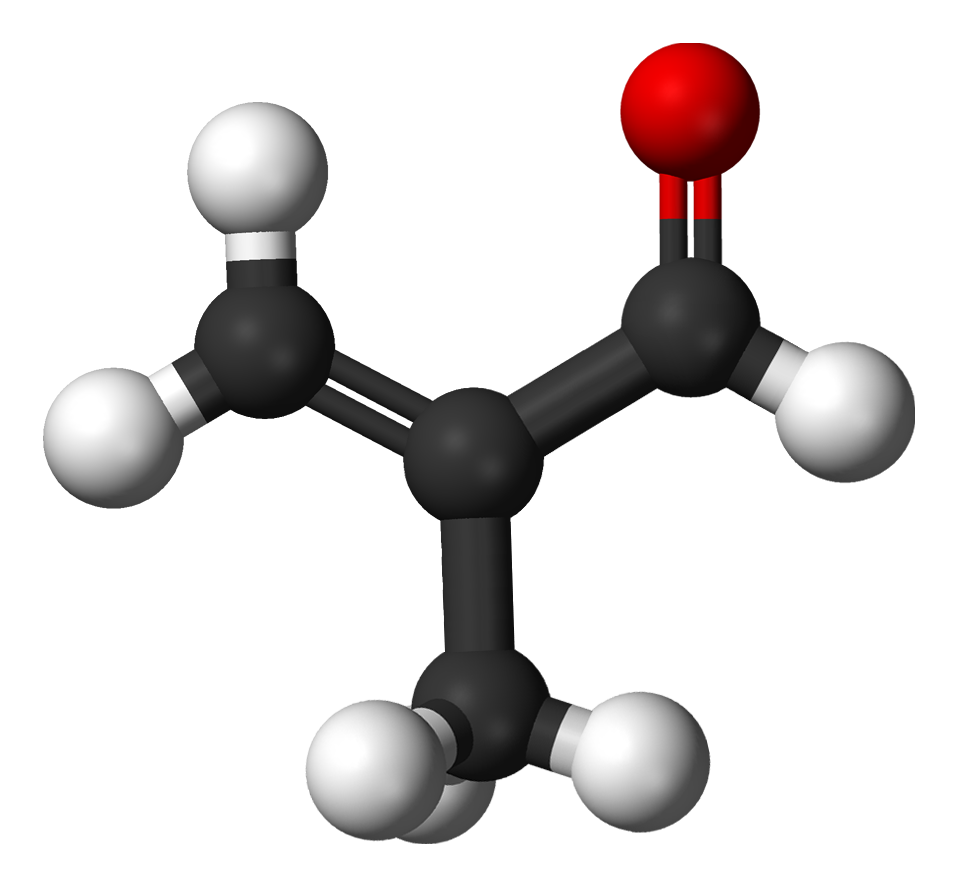
Ball-and-stick model of methacrolein

Names
- Preferred IUPAC name 2-Methylprop-2-enal
- Other names Methacrolein; Methacrylaldehyde; Isobutenal

Identifiers
CAS Number	78-85-3
3D model (JSmol)	Interactive image
ChemSpider	6314
ECHA InfoCard	100.001.046
PubChem CID	6562
UNII	9HRB24892H
CompTox Dashboard (EPA)	DTXSID0052540
- InChI: InChI=1S/C4H6O/c1-4(2)3-5/h3H,1H2,2H3 Key: STNJBCKSHOAVAJ-UHFFFAOYSA-N; InChI=1/C4H6O/c1-4(2)3-5/h3H,1H2,2H3 Key: STNJBCKSHOAVAJ-UHFFFAOYAU
- SMILES: O=CC(=C)C

Properties
Chemical formula	C_{4}H_{6}O
Molar mass	70.09 g/mol
Density	0.847 g/cm^{3}
Melting point	−81 °C (−114 °F; 192 K)
Boiling point	69 °C (156 °F; 342 K)

Related compounds
Related alkenals	Citral Citronellal trans-2-Methyl-but-2-enal
- Except where otherwise noted, data are given for materials in their standard state (at 25 °C [77 °F], 100 kPa). verify (what is ?) Infobox references

Methacrolein, or methacrylaldehyde, is an unsaturated aldehyde. It is a clear, colorless, flammable liquid.

Methacrolein is one of two major products resulting from the reaction of isoprene with OH in the atmosphere, the other product being methyl vinyl ketone (MVK, also known as butenone). These compounds are important components of the atmospheric oxidation chemistry of biogenic chemicals, which can result in the formation of ozone and/or particulates. Methacrylaldehyde is also present in cigarette smoke. It can be found in the essential oil of the plant Big Sagebrush (Artemisia tridentata) which contains 5% methacrolein.

Industrially, the primary use of methacrolein is in the manufacture of polymers and synthetic resins.

Exposure to methacrolein is highly irritating to the eyes, nose, throat and lungs.

== See also ==
- Acrolein
- Methacrylic acid
