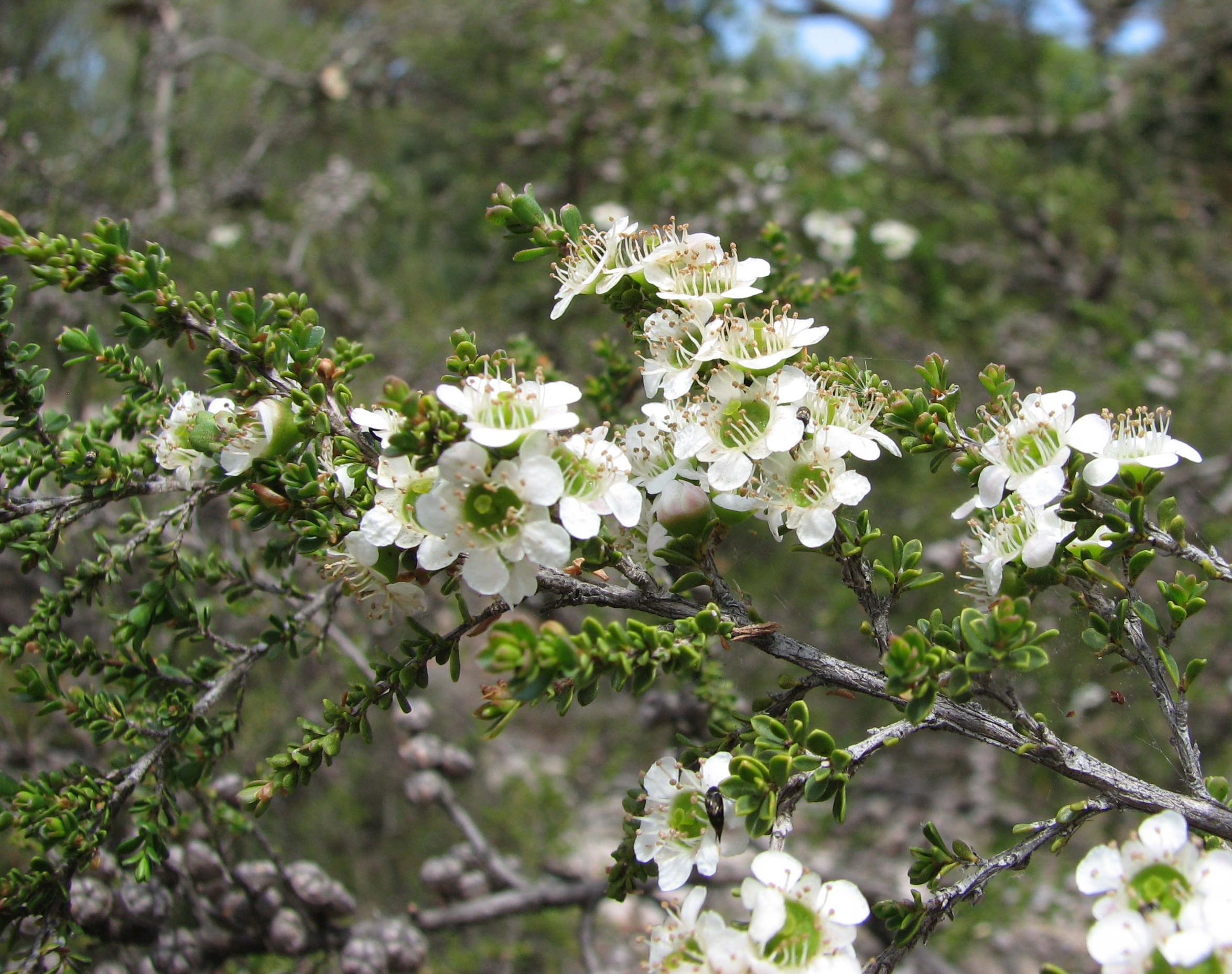
- Leptospermum liversidgei in Maranoa Gardens

Scientific classification
- Kingdom: Plantae
- Clade: Tracheophytes
- Clade: Angiosperms
- Clade: Eudicots
- Clade: Rosids
- Order: Myrtales
- Family: Myrtaceae
- Genus: Leptospermum
- Species: L. liversidgei

Binomial name
- Leptospermum liversidgei R.T.Baker & H.G.Sm.
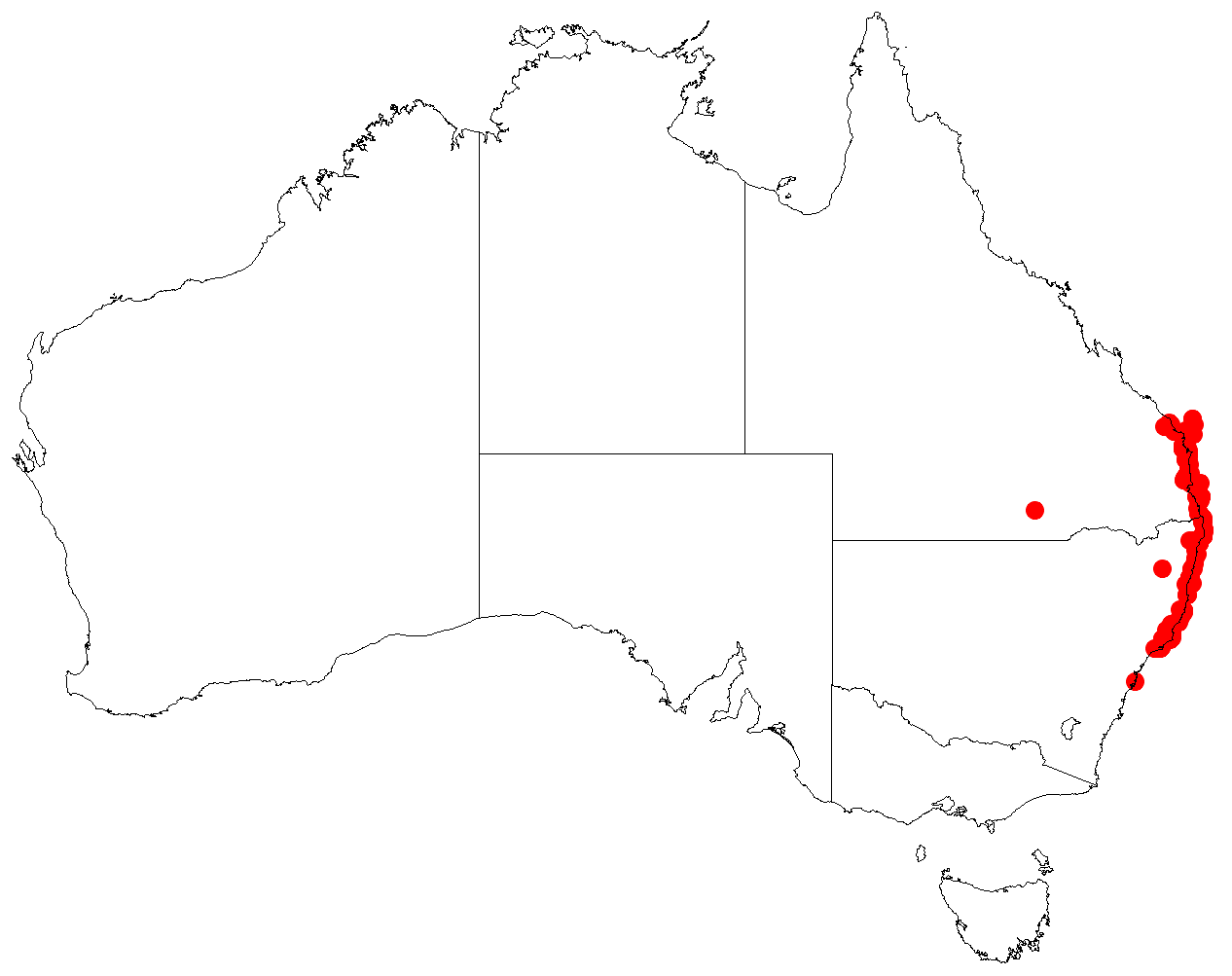
- Occurrence data from AVH

Synonyms
- Leptospermum flavescens var. citriodorum F.M.Bailey; Leptospermum polygalifolium var. citriodorum (F.M.Bailey) Domin

= Leptospermum liversidgei =

Olive tea-tree

Species of shrub

Leptospermum liversidgei, commonly known as the olive tea-tree, is a species of compact shrub that is endemic to eastern Australia. It has narrow egg-shaped, lemon-scented leaves, white or pink flowers and woody fruit that remain on the plant at maturity.

== Description ==
Leptospermum liversidgei is a shrub that typically grows to a height of 4 m (13 ft) and has thin, rough bark on the main branches and hairy young stems. The leaves are crowded, narrow egg-shaped and lemon-scented, mostly 5–7 mm (0.20–0.28 in) long and 1–2 mm (0.039–0.079 in) wide on a very short petiole. The flowers are white or pink, 10–12 mm (0.39–0.47 in) wide on a pedicel 1–1.5 mm (0.039–0.059 in) long, arranged singly on the ends of short, leafless side branches. The floral cup is dark coloured, about 2.5 mm (0.098 in) long, the sepals hemispherical to triangular, about 2 mm (0.079 in) long, the petals about 5 mm (0.20 in) long and the stamens 1.5–2.5 mm (0.059–0.098 in) long. Flowering mainly occurs in January and the fruit is a woody capsule 7–10 mm (0.28–0.39 in) wide and that is not shed when mature.

== Taxonomy and naming ==
Leptospermum liversidgei was first formally described in 1905 by Richard Thomas Baker and Henry George Smith in the Journal and Proceedings of the Royal Society of New South Wales. The specific epithet (liversidgei) honours Archibald Liversidge.

== Distribution and habitat ==
Olive tea-tree occurs in coastal swamps between the Bundaberg region of Queensland and Tomago in New South Wales where it grows in heath.

== Use in horticulture ==
The size of this tea-tree makes it suitable for smaller gardens where it will tolerate poorly-drained soil and at least moderate frost. The leaves contain the essential oil citronellal and the plant is sometimes alleged to repel mosquitoes.
