= Archibald Liversidge =

British chemist and mineralogist

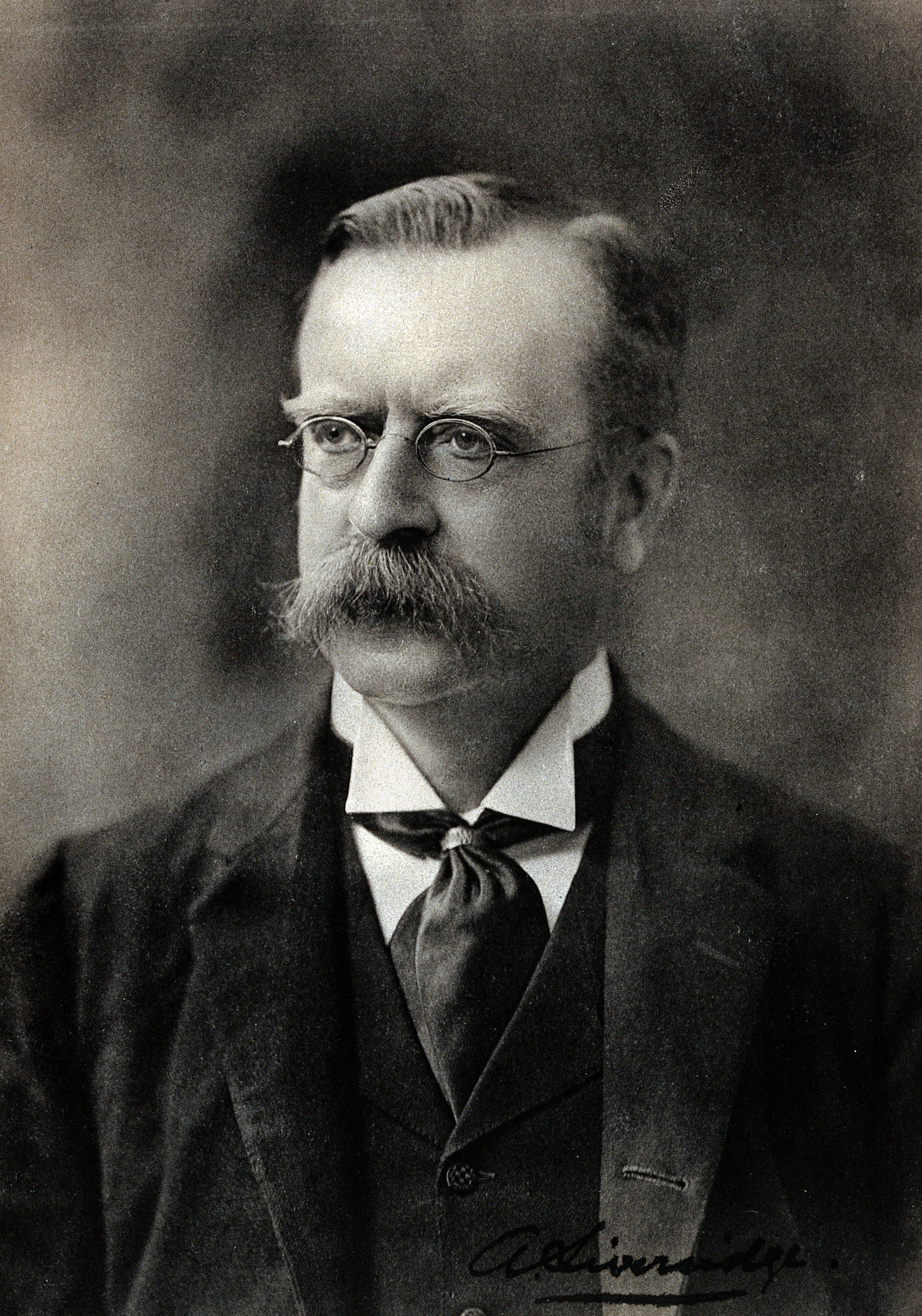
Archibald Liversidge (1898)

Archibald Liversidge FRS FRSE FRSNSW LLD (17 November 1846 – 26 September 1927) was an English-born chemist and a co-founder of the Australasian Association for the Advancement of Science.

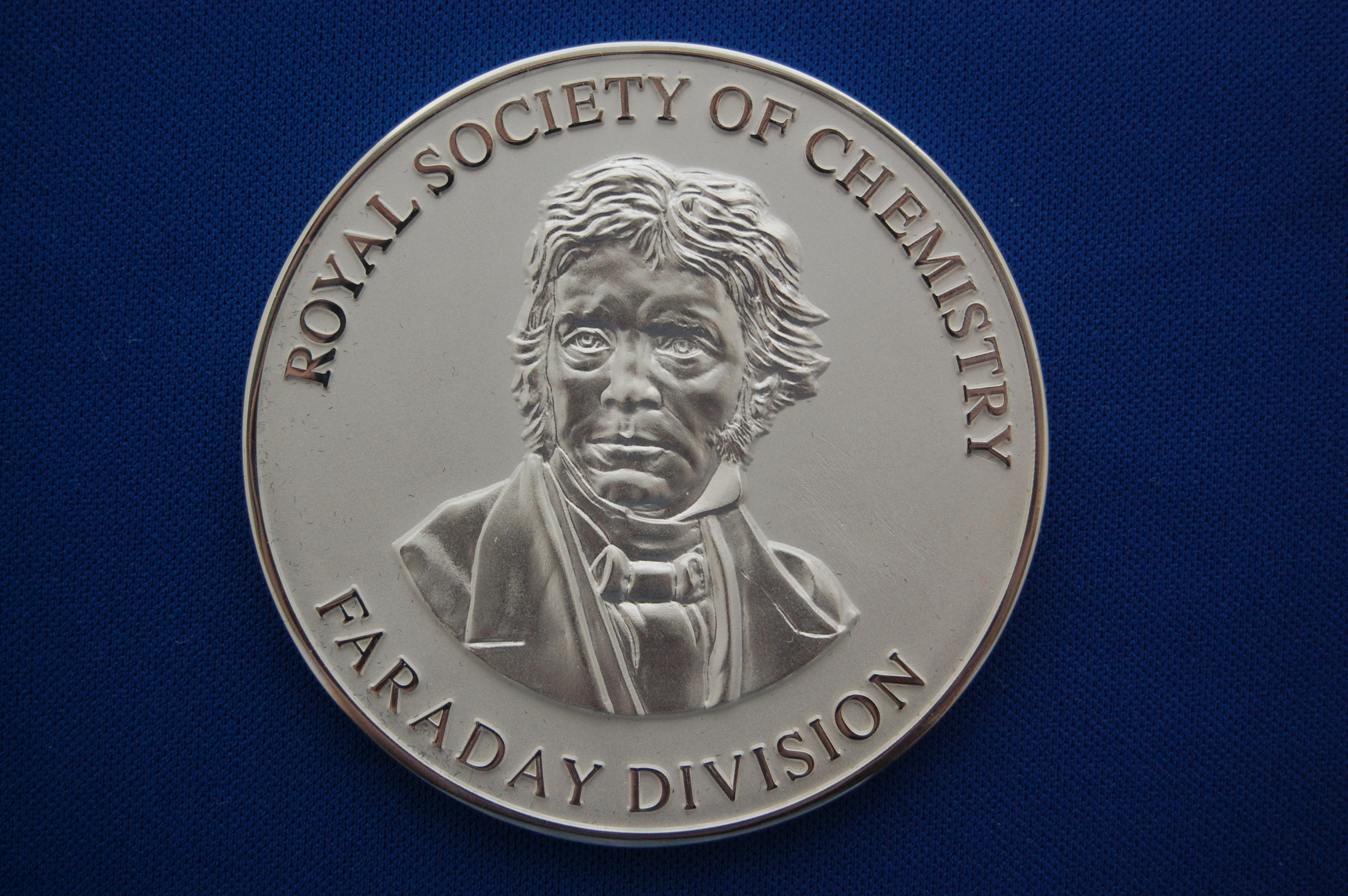
The 2014 Liversidge Award medal

The Faraday Division of the Royal Society of Chemistry issues a Liversidge Award, named in his honour.

Leptospermum liversidgei, a heath plant of eastern Australia, is named after Archibald Liversidge.
