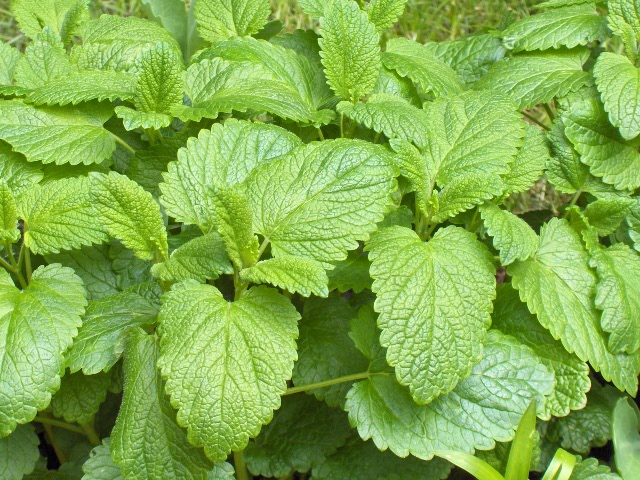
- Melissa officinalis

Scientific classification
- Kingdom: Plantae
- Clade: Tracheophytes
- Clade: Angiosperms
- Clade: Eudicots
- Clade: Asterids
- Order: Lamiales
- Family: Lamiaceae
- Subfamily: Nepetoideae
- Tribe: Mentheae
- Genus: Melissa; L.

Synonyms
- Mutelia Gren. ex Mutel

= Melissa (plant) =

Genus of flowering plants

Melissa is a genus of perennial herbs in the family Lamiaceae. Its species are native to Europe and Asia but cultivated and naturalized in many other places. The name Melissa is derived from the Greek word μέλισσα (mélissa) meaning "honeybee", owing to the abundance of nectar in the flowers. The stems are square, like most other plants in the mint family. The leaves are borne in opposite pairs on the stems, and are usually ovate or heart-shaped and emit a lemony scent when bruised. Axillary spikes of white or yellowish flowers appear in the summer.

The most commonly grown species of this genus is Melissa officinalis, commonly known in the United States as lemon balm, and as balm in England.

== Species ==
1. Melissa axillaris (Benth.) Bakh.f. - China, Tibet, Taiwan, Himalayas, Indochina, Sumatra, Java
2. Melissa flava Benth. ex Wall. - Tibet, Nepal, Bhutan, Himalayas of northern + Eastern India
3. Melissa officinalis L. - Mediterranean, southwestern + central Asia from Portugal + Morocco to Tajikistan; naturalized in northern Europe, New Zealand, United States, Canada, southern South America
4. Melissa yunnanensis C.Y.Wu & Y.C.Huang - Tibet, Yunnan

== Cultivation ==
They are very frost hardy plants which prefer full sun or light shade if summers are hot. They are quick growing. M. officinalis has become naturalised in many parts of the world.
