= Citronellal =

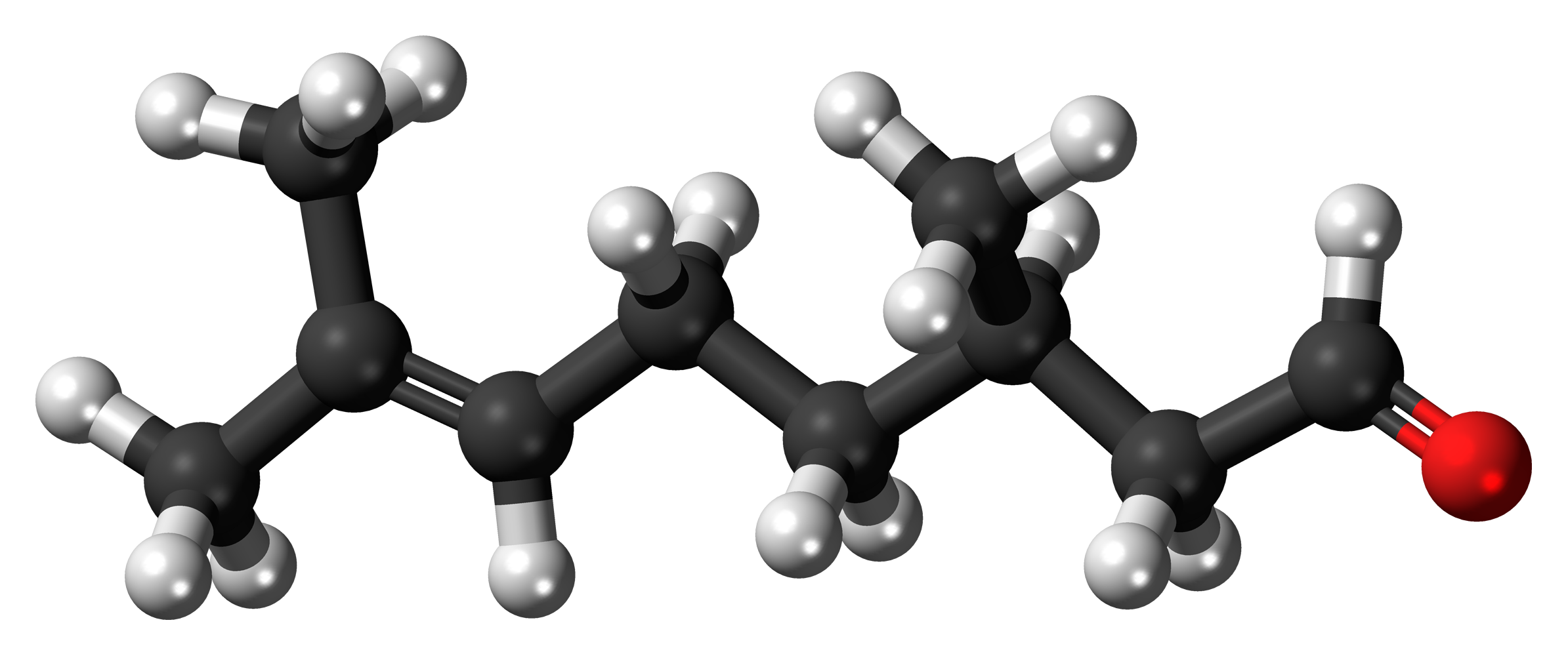
- (+)-Citronellal

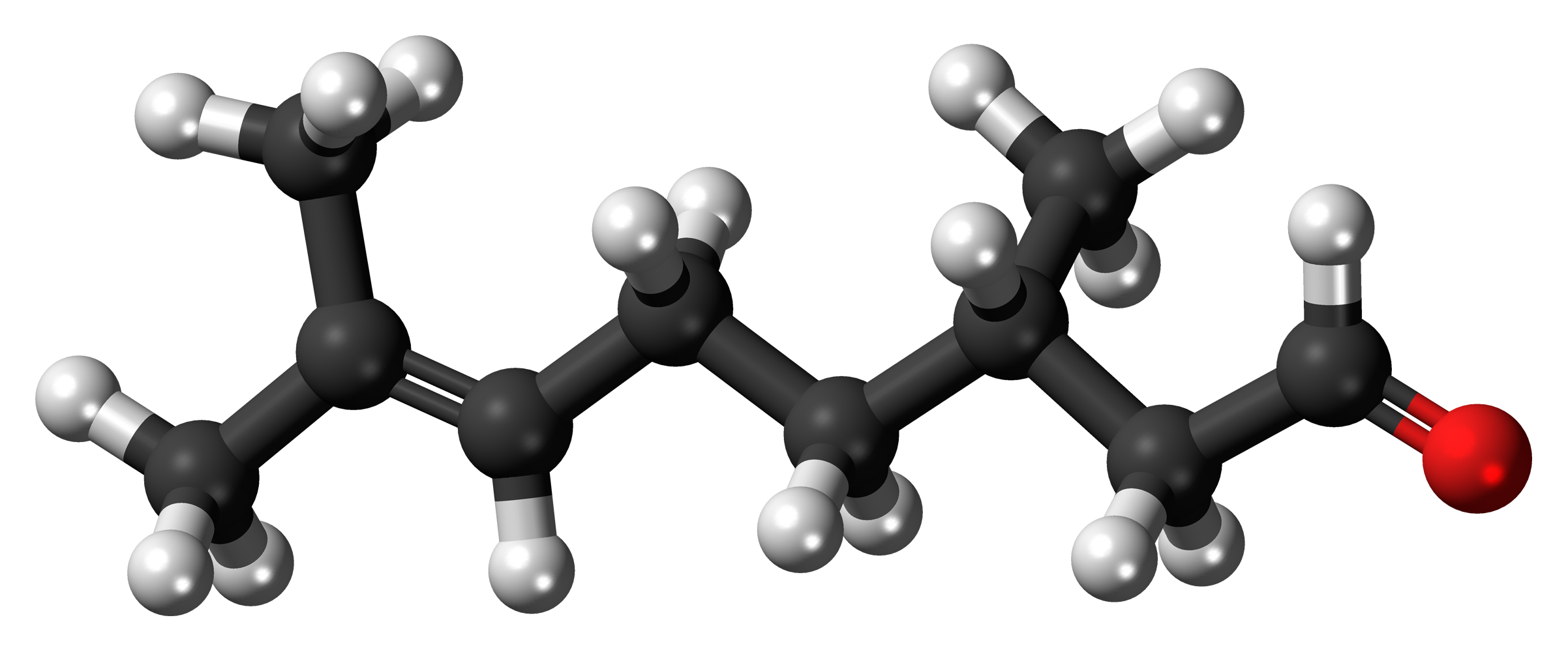
- (-)-Citronellal

Names
- IUPAC name 3,7-dimethyloct-6-enal

Identifiers
CAS Number	106-23-0
3D model (JSmol)	Interactive image; Interactive image
Beilstein Reference	1209447 1720789
ChEBI	CHEBI:47856
ChEMBL	ChEMBL447944
ChemSpider	7506
ECHA InfoCard	100.003.070
EC Number	203-376-6
Gmelin Reference	1521962
KEGG	C17384
PubChem CID	7794
UNII	QB99VZZ7GZ
CompTox Dashboard (EPA)	DTXSID3041790
- InChI: InChI=1S/C10H18O/c1-9(2)5-4-6-10(3)7-8-11/h5,8,10H,4,6-7H2,1-3H3 Key: NEHNMFOYXAPHSD-UHFFFAOYSA-N; InChI=1/C10H18O/c1-9(2)5-4-6-10(3)7-8-11/h5,8,10H,4,6-7H2,1-3H3 Key: NEHNMFOYXAPHSD-UHFFFAOYAH
- SMILES: C/C(C)=C/CCC(C)CC=O; O=CCC(CC/C=C(/C)C)C

Properties
Chemical formula	C_{10}H_{18}O
Molar mass	154.25 g/mol
Density	0.855 g/cm^{3}
Boiling point	201 to 207 °C (394 to 405 °F; 474 to 480 K)

Hazards
- GHS labelling
Pictograms	(GHS07: Exclamation mark) (GHS09: Environmental hazard)
Signal word	Warning
Hazard statements	H315, H317, H411
Precautionary statements	P262, P273, P280, P302+P352

Related compounds
Related alkenals	Citral Methacrolein trans-2-Methyl-2-butenal
- Except where otherwise noted, data are given for materials in their standard state (at 25 °C [77 °F], 100 kPa). verify (what is ?) Infobox references

Citronellal or rhodinal (C_{10}H_{18}O) is a monoterpenoid aldehyde, the main component in the mixture of terpenoid chemical compounds that give citronella oil its distinctive lemon scent.

Citronellal is a main isolate in distilled oils from the plants Cymbopogon (excepting C. citratus, culinary lemongrass), lemon-scented gum, and lemon-scented teatree. The (S)-(−)-enantiomer of citronellal makes up to 80% of the oil from kaffir lime leaves and is the compound responsible for its characteristic aroma.

Citronellal has insect repellent properties, and research shows high repellent effectiveness against mosquitoes. Another research shows that citronellal has strong antifungal qualities.

== Compendial status ==
- British Pharmacopoeia

== See also ==
- Citral
- Citronellol
- Citronella oil
- Hydroxycitronellal
- Perfume allergy
