= Citral =

- Geranial

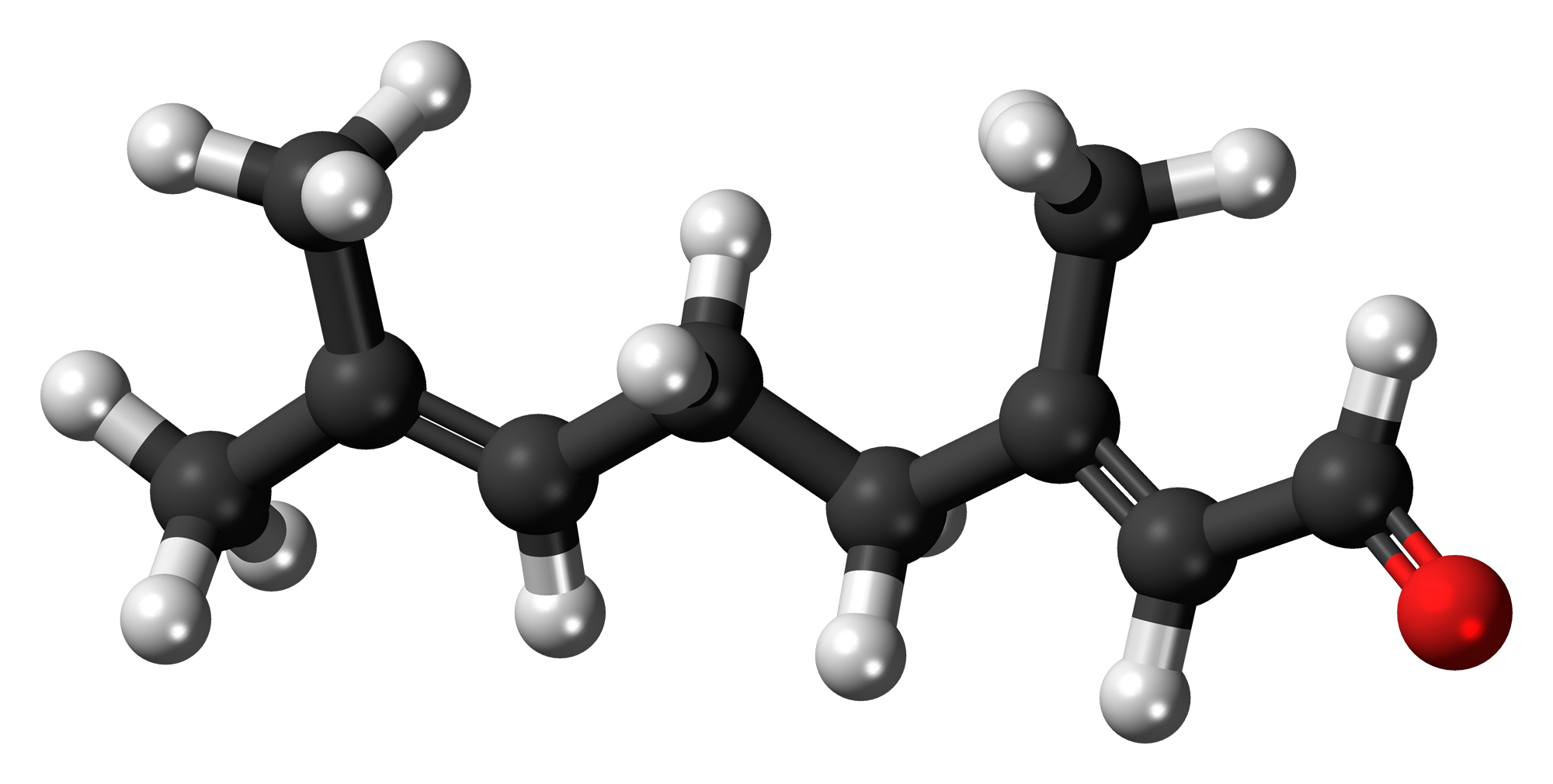

- Neral

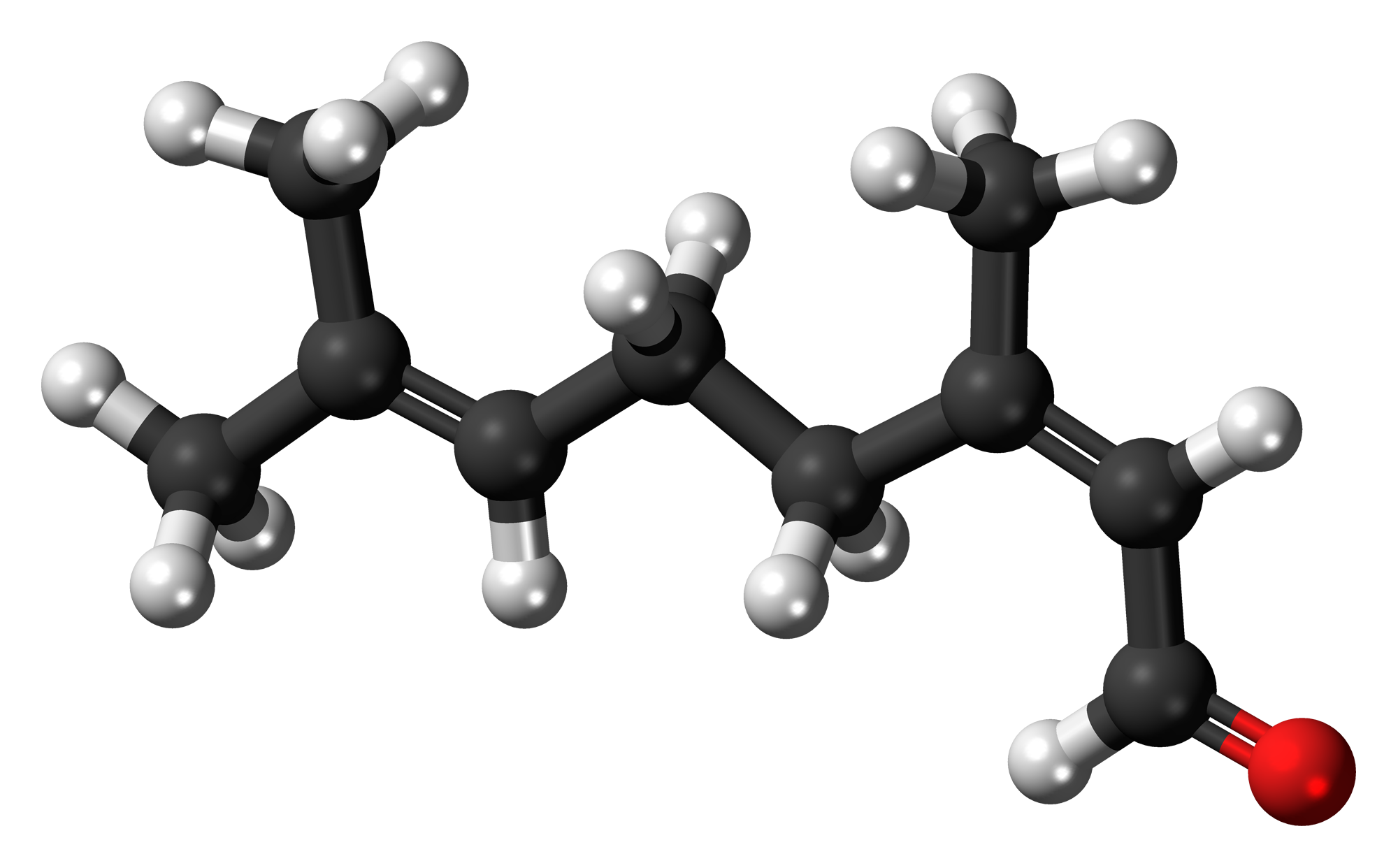

Names
- IUPAC name 3,7-dimethylocta-2,6-dienal
- Other names citral geranialdehyde

Identifiers
CAS Number	5392-40-5
3D model (JSmol)	Interactive image; Interactive image
ChEBI	CHEBI:16980
ChEMBL	ChEMBL1080997
ChemSpider	553578
ECHA InfoCard	100.023.994
EC Number	226-394-6
IUPHAR/BPS	6327
KEGG	C01499
PubChem CID	638011
RTECS number	RG5075000
UNII	T7EU0O9VPP
UN number	2810
CompTox Dashboard (EPA)	DTXSID6024836
- InChI: InChI=1S/C10H16O/c1-9(2)5-4-6-10(3)7-8-11/h5,7-8H,4,6H2,1-3H3/b10-7+ Key: WTEVQBCEXWBHNA-JXMROGBWSA-N; InChI=1/C10H16O/c1-9(2)5-4-6-10(3)7-8-11/h5,7-8H,4,6H2,1-3H3/b10-7+ Key: WTEVQBCEXWBHNA-JXMROGBWBB
- SMILES: O=CC=C(C)CCC=C(C)C; O=C/C=C(/CC/C=C(/C)C)C

Properties
Chemical formula	C_{10}H_{16}O
Molar mass	152.24 g/mol
Appearance	Pale yellow liquid
Odor	Lemon like
Density	0.893 g/cm^{3}
Boiling point	229 °C (444 °F; 502 K)
Vapor pressure	0.22 mmHg (20 °C)
Magnetic susceptibility (χ)	−98.9×10^{−6} cm^{3}/mol

Hazards
- GHS labelling
Pictograms	(GHS07: Exclamation mark)
Signal word	Warning
Hazard statements	H315, H317
Precautionary statements	P261, P264, P272, P280, P302+P352, P321, P332+P313, P333+P313, P362, P363, P501
NFPA 704 (fire diamond)	0 1 0
Flash point	91 °C (196 °F; 364 K)

Related compounds
Related alkenals	Citronellal; Methacrolein; trans-2-Methyl-2-butenal
- Except where otherwise noted, data are given for materials in their standard state (at 25 °C [77 °F], 100 kPa). verify (what is ?) Infobox references

Citral is an acyclic monoterpene aldehyde. Being a monoterpene, it is made of two isoprene units. Citral is a collective term which covers two geometric isomers that have their own separate names; the E-isomer is named geranial (trans-citral; α-citral) or citral A. The Z-isomer is named neral (cis-citral; β-citral) or citral B. These stereoisomers occur as a mixture, often not in equal proportions; e.g. in essential oil of Australian ginger, the neral to geranial ratio is 0.61.

== Natural Occurrence ==
Citral is present in the volatile oils of several plants:

- lemon myrtle (90–98%)
- Litsea citrata (90%)
- Litsea cubeba (70–85%)
- lemongrass (65–85%)
- lemon tea-tree (70–80%)
- Ocimum gratissimum (66.5%)
- Lindera citriodora (about 65%)
- Calypranthes parriculata (about 62%)
- petitgrain (36%)
- lemon verbena (30–35%)
- lemon ironbark (26%)
- lemon balm (11%)
- lime (6–9%)
- lemon (2–5%)
- orange

Of the many sources of citral, the Australian tree Backhousia citriodora (family Myrtaceae) is considered superior.

== Uses ==
Citral is a precursor in the industrial production of vitamin A, vitamin E, vitamin K.

Citral is also precursor to lycopene, ionone and methylionone.

=== Fragrances ===
Citral has a strong lemon (citrus) scent and is used as an aroma compound in perfumery. It is used to fortify lemon oil presenting as sharp, lemon, sweet, fresh, juicy, lemon peel, tart, and green. (Neral, the (Z)-isomer, has a less sweet citrus, lemon, lemon peel note, whilst Geranial, the (E)-isomer is described as citrus, lemon.) The aldehydes citronellal and citral are considered key components responsible for the lemon note with citral preferred.

It also has pheromonal effects in acari and insects.

The herb Cymbopogon citratus has shown promising insecticidal and antifungal activity against storage pests.

=== Food additive ===
Citral is commonly used as a food additive ingredient.

It has been tested (2016) in vitro against the food-borne pathogen Cronobacter sakazakii.

== See also ==
- Citronellal
- Geraniol
- Limonene
- Nerol
- Vaporizer
