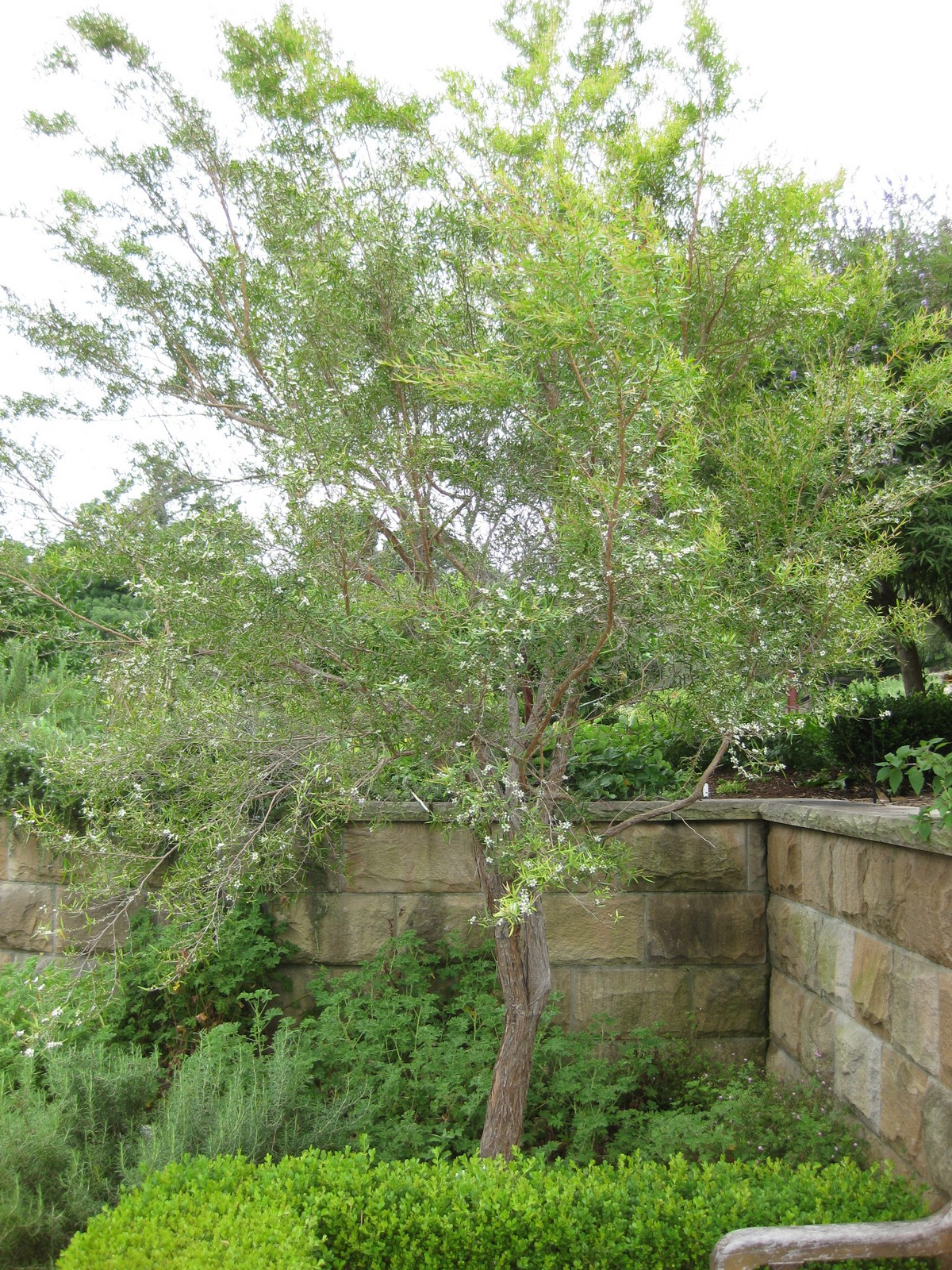

Scientific classification
- Kingdom: Plantae
- Clade: Tracheophytes
- Clade: Angiosperms
- Clade: Eudicots
- Clade: Rosids
- Order: Myrtales
- Family: Myrtaceae
- Genus: Leptospermum
- Species: L. petersonii

Binomial name
- Leptospermum petersonii F.M.Bailey

Synonyms
- Leptospermum citratum (J.F.Bailey & C.T.White) Challinor, Cheel & A.R.Penfold; Leptospermum flavescens var. citratum J.F.Bailey & C.T.White; Leptospermum petersonii F.M.Bailey subsp. petersonii

= Leptospermum petersonii =

Species of shrub

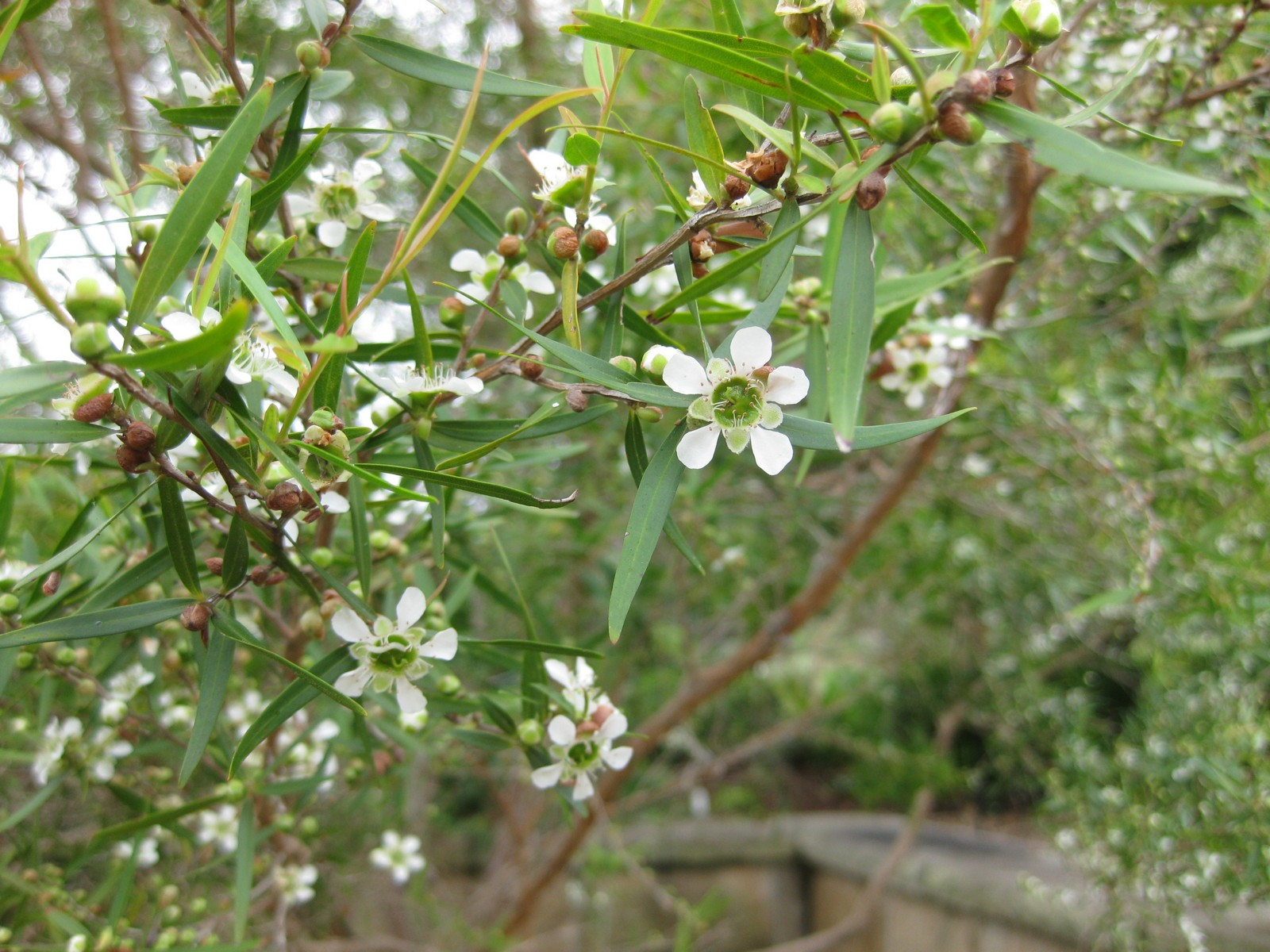
flowers

Leptospermum petersonii, commonly known as lemon-scented teatree, is a species of shrub or small tree that is endemic to eastern Australia. It has thin, fibrous or flaky bark, often strongly-scented elliptic to lance-shaped leaves, white flowers and fruit that are retained for several years. It is commonly grown as an ornamental and is regarded as a minor environmental weed in some areas.

== Description ==
Leptospermum petersonii is a shrub or small tree that typically grows to a height of about 5 m (16 ft) or more. It has thin, rough, fibrous or flaky bark on the stems, and glabrous branchlets that have a flange under the leaf bases. New growth is often tinged with red or purple. The leaves are elliptical to narrow lance-shaped, mostly 20–40 mm (0.79–1.57 in) long and 2–5 mm (0.079–0.197 in) wide, often strongly-scented and lack a petiole. The flowers are white, about 10–15 mm (0.39–0.59 in) in diameter and usually arranged singly on short side shoots. The flower buds have thin, papery, reddish brown bracts and bracteoles at the base but that usually fall as the bud develops. The floral cup is mostly glabrous, dark-coloured, 3–4 mm (0.12–0.16 in) long and the sepals are hemispherical, 1.5–2.5 mm (0.059–0.098 in) long. The petals are 5–6 mm (0.20–0.24 in) long and the stamens 2.5–3.5 mm (0.098–0.138 in) long. Flowering mainly occurs from December to January and the fruit is a capsule about 6 mm (0.24 in) wide. The capsules remain on the younger stems but are lost as the plant ages.

== Taxonomy and naming ==
Leptospermum petersonii was first formally described in 1905 by Frederick Manson Bailey in the Queensland Agricultural Journal from a specimen collected by W.J. Peterson on Wilsons Peak in January 1905.

== Distribution and habitat ==
Lemon-scented teatree grows in sclerophyll forest or rainforest near creeks or on rocky escarpments south from Mount Timbeerwah in south-east Queensland to near Port Macquarie in New South Wales.

== Ecology ==
This teatree is commonly grown in gardens from where it sometimes spreads. It has become established in some places beyond its natural range, including in native vegetation near Sydney and Melbourne and in Hawaii.

== Uses ==
=== Essential oils ===
The essential oil from L. petersonii inhibits the pathological fungi Candida albicans and Aspergillus fumigatus.

=== Use in horticulture ===
Lemon-scented teatree is well known as a garden plant, popular for its scent and attractiveness. It is fast growing and can be kept to shrub height by pruning. The ability to be pruned regularly also makes it well-suited for hedges, windbreaks and harvesting for distilled essential oils.
