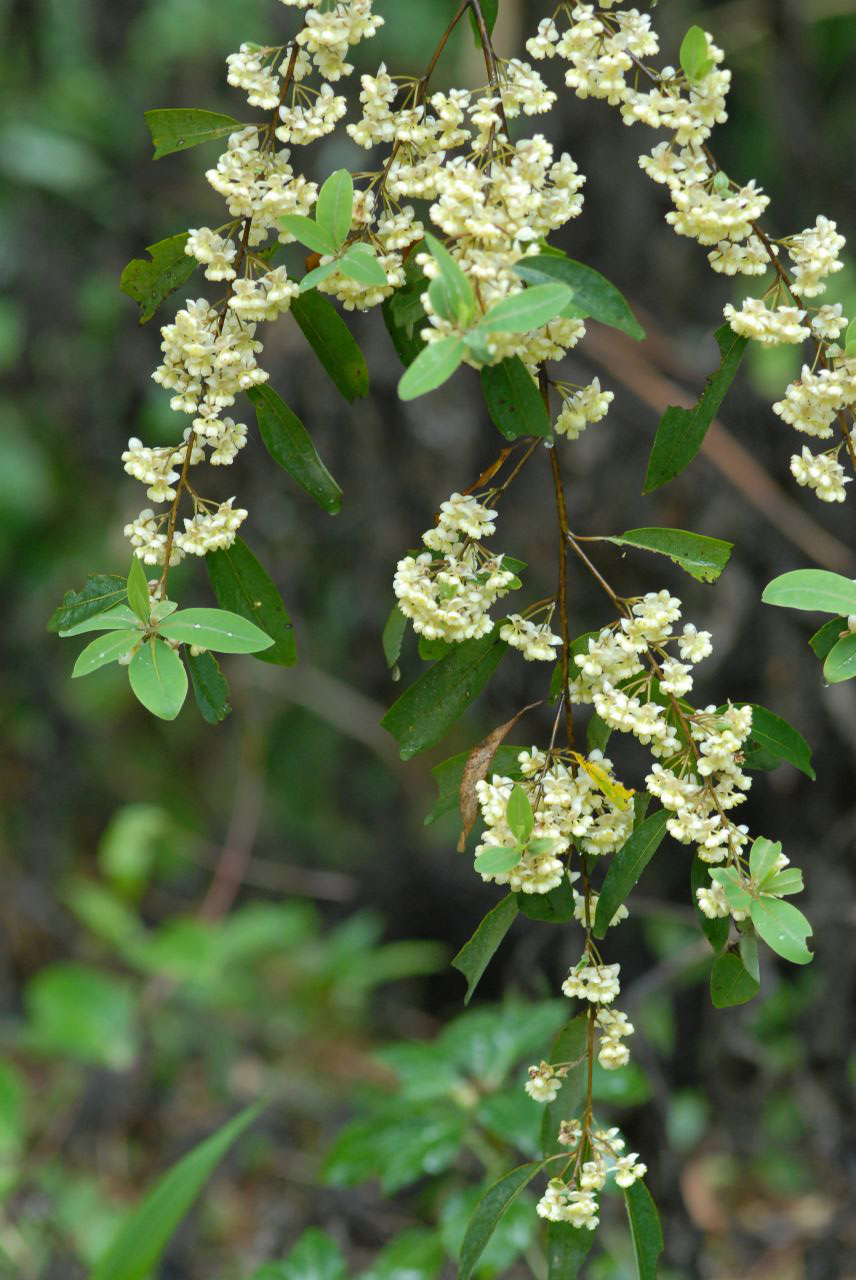

Conservation status
- Least Concern (IUCN 3.1)

Scientific classification
- Kingdom: Plantae
- Clade: Tracheophytes
- Clade: Angiosperms
- Clade: Magnoliids
- Order: Laurales
- Family: Lauraceae
- Genus: Litsea
- Species: L. cubeba

Binomial name
- Litsea cubeba (Lour.) Pers.

Varieties
- Litsea cubeba var. cubeba; Litsea cubeba var. formosana (Nakai) Yen C.Yang & P.H.Huang

Synonyms
- Benzoin cubeba (Lour.) Hatus.; Cubeba pipereta Raf.; Daphnidium cubeba (Lour.) Nees; Laurus cubeba Lour.; Malapoenna cubeba (Lour.) Kuntze; Persea cubeba (Lour.) Spreng.; Tetranthera cubeba (Lour.) Kostel.; synonyms of var. cubeba: Actinodaphne citrata (Blume) Hayata; Aperula oxyphylla (Nees) Blume; Benzoin aromaticum (Brandis) Rehder; Benzoin oxyphyllum (Nees) Kuntze; Cylicodaphne citrata (Blume) Kostel.; Daphnidium oxyphyllum Nees; Laurus piperita Meisn.; Lindera aromatica Brandis; Lindera citrata (Blume) Koidz.; Lindera dielsii H.Lév.; Lindera oxyphylla (Nees) Hook.f.; Lindera reticulosa Kosterm.; Litsea citrata Blume; Litsea cubeba f. glabrata (Diels) N.Chao & J.S.Liu; Litsea cubeba f. obtusifolia Yen C.Yang & P.H.Huang; Litsea dielsii (H.Lév.) H.Lév.; Litsea mollifolia var. glabrata (Diels) Chun; Litsea mollis var. 'glabrata Diels; Litsea muchuanensis Z.Y.Zhu; Litsea piperita Mirb.; Malapoenna citrata (Blume) Kuntze; Malapoenna oliveriana Kuntze; Tetranthera angustifolia Zoll. ex Meisn.; Tetranthera citrata (Blume) Nees; Tetranthera diepenhorstii Miq.; Tetranthera floribunda Champ. ex Benth.; Tetranthera oxyphylla Wall.; Tetranthera polyantha Wall. ex Nees; synonyms of var. formosana: Aperula formosana Nakai

= Litsea cubeba =

May chang

Species of tree

Litsea cubeba is a species of evergreen tree in the family Lauraceae. It is a shrub that grows up to 5–12 meters high. It is sometimes referred to by the common names the aromatic litsea, may chang, mountain pepper (山胡椒; pinyin: shānhújiāo), mujiangzi (木姜子; pinyin: mùjiāngzǐ) or douchijiang (豆豉姜; pinyin: dòuchǐjiāng) in Mandarin and maqaw (馬告) by the Atayal of Taiwan. It produces a fruit which is processed for its lemony essential oil. The oil can also be extracted from the leaf, but this is considered to be lower in quality. The timber is sometimes used for making furniture and crafts. Plant parts are also used in medicine.

== Distribution ==
It is native to Assam, Bangladesh, Borneo, Cambodia, South-Central and Southeast China, East Himalaya, Hainan, Japan, Java, Laos, Malaysia, Myanmar, Nansei-shoto, Nepal, Sumatera, Taiwan, Thailand, Tibet, and Vietnam.

== Oil extraction ==
Essential oil yields from the fruit are 3–5%. The oil's main component is citral, at 70–85% of the oil. It is mainly produced in China from plantations and is marketed as "Litsea cubeba", with production estimates between 500 and 1,500 tonnes of oil per annum. The oil is used as a fragrance (especially in bar soap) and for flavouring in its own right. It is also used as a raw material by the chemical industry for the synthesis of vitamin A and violet-like fragrances.

== As a spice ==
It is used extensively as a spice by the aboriginal peoples of Taiwan, it is seen as a distinguishing feature of aboriginal cuisine.
