= Trans-2-Methyl-2-butenal =

trans-2-Methyl-2-butenal

Names
- Preferred IUPAC name (2E)-2-Methylbut-2-enal
- Other names (E)-2-Methylbut-2-enal trans-2-Methyl-2-butenal trans-2,3-Dimethylacrolein; Tiglic aldehyde Tiglinaldehyde; Tiglaldehyde

Identifiers
| CAS Number | 497-03-0 |
| 3D model (JSmol) | Interactive image |
| ChEMBL | ChEMBL53493 |
| ChemSpider | 4479558 |
| ECHA InfoCard | 100.007.122 |
| PubChem CID | 5321950 |
| UNII | 27ZVE2K81C |
| CompTox Dashboard (EPA) | DTXSID1049308 |
- InChI: InChI=1S/C5H8O/c1-3-5(2)4-6/h3-4H,1-2H3/b5-3+ Key: ACWQBUSCFPJUPN-HWKANZROSA-N; InChI=1/C5H8O/c1-3-5(2)4-6/h3-4H,1-2H3/b5-3+ Key: ACWQBUSCFPJUPN-HWKANZROBA
- SMILES: O=C/C(=C/C)C

Properties
| Chemical formula | C_{5}H_{8}O |
| Molar mass | 84.12 |
| Appearance | colorless liquid |
| Density | 0.871 |
| Melting point | −78 °C (−108 °F; 195 K) |
| Boiling point | 116 to 119 °C (241 to 246 °F; 389 to 392 K) (752 mm Hg) |

Hazards
| Flash point | 65 °C (149 °F; 338 K) |

Related compounds
| Related alkenals | Citral Citronellal; Methacrolein |
- Except where otherwise noted, data are given for materials in their standard state (at 25 °C [77 °F], 100 kPa). verify (what is ?) Infobox references

trans-2-Methyl-2-butenal is an organic compound with the formula CH_{3}CH=C(CH_{3})CHO. This colorless liquid is a building block in organic synthesis. It is an α,β-unsaturated aldehyde related to the better-known crotonaldehyde. The European rabbit, Oryctolagus cuniculus, uses 2-methyl-2-butenal as a pheromone. The rabbit pheromone, trans-2-methyl-2-butenal, was reported to be involved in the communication between species, defined under the class of "interomone."
