= 3-Penten-2-one =

Names
- Preferred IUPAC name Pent-3-en-2-one
- Other names Ethylidene acetone

Identifiers
CAS Number	625-33-2 (unspecified); 3102-33-8 (E); 3102-32-7 (Z)
3D model (JSmol)	(E): Interactive image; (Z): Interactive image
Beilstein Reference	3-01-00-02985
ChemSpider	11747 (unspecified); 553493 (E); 4512214 (Z)
ECHA InfoCard	100.009.899
EC Number	210-888-3
PubChem CID	12248 (unspecified); 637920 (E); 5356572 (Z)
UNII	4WN5NGB7KX (E); W8XX21WHYC (Z)
CompTox Dashboard (EPA)	DTXSID0060800
- InChI: (unspecified): InChI=1S/C5H8O/c1-3-4-5(2)6/h3-4H,1-2H3 Key: LABTWGUMFABVFG-UHFFFAOYSA-N; (E): InChI=1S/C5H8O/c1-3-4-5(2)6/h3-4H,1-2H3/b4-3+ Key: LABTWGUMFABVFG-ONEGZZNKSA-N; (Z): InChI=1S/C5H8O/c1-3-4-5(2)6/h3-4H,1-2H3/b4-3- Key: LABTWGUMFABVFG-ARJAWSKDSA-N
- SMILES: (unspecified): CC=CC(=O)C; (E): C/C=C/C(=O)C; (Z): C/C=C\C(=O)C

Properties
Chemical formula	C_{5}H_{8}O
Molar mass	84.118 g·mol^{−1}
Appearance	colourless liquid
Density	0.861 g·cm^{−3} 0,862 g·cm^{−3} (E)
Boiling point	122 °C (252 °F; 395 K)
Solubility in water	soluble in water, acetone and ether (E)

Hazards
- Occupational safety and health (OHS/OSH)
Main hazards	Flammable and toxic
- GHS labelling
Pictograms	(GHS02: Flammable) (GHS07: Exclamation mark)
Signal word	Danger
Hazard statements	H225, H312, H315, H319, H335
Precautionary statements	P210, P233, P240, P241, P242, P243, P261, P264, P271, P280, P302+P352, P303+P361+P353, P304+P340, P305+P351+P338, P312, P321, P322, P332+P313, P337+P313, P362, P363, P370+P378, P403+P233, P403+P235, P405, P501
Safety data sheet (SDS)	Safety Data Sheet
- Except where otherwise noted, data are given for materials in their standard state (at 25 °C [77 °F], 100 kPa). Infobox references

3-Penten-2-one is an organic compound with the formula CH_{3}C(O)CH=CHCH_{3}. It exists as (E) and (Z) stereoisomers. The compound is classified as an α,β-unsaturated ketone. It is a colorless volatile liquid with fruity to pungent odor.

== Preparation, occurrence, uses ==
The (E) isomer is classically obtained from the 3-chloropentanone by dehydrohalogenation. It can also be obtained by dehydration of 4-hydroxy-pentan-2-one using oxalic acid as a catalyst.

3-Penten-2-one occurs naturally in the berries of two species of Aronia melanocarpa. It has also been found in other plants and foods such as tomatoes, cocoa, tea, and potato chips.

3-Penten-2-one can be used for the synthesis of other compounds such as the alkaloids senepodine G and cermizine C, for example. It is also a useful flavoring agent.
