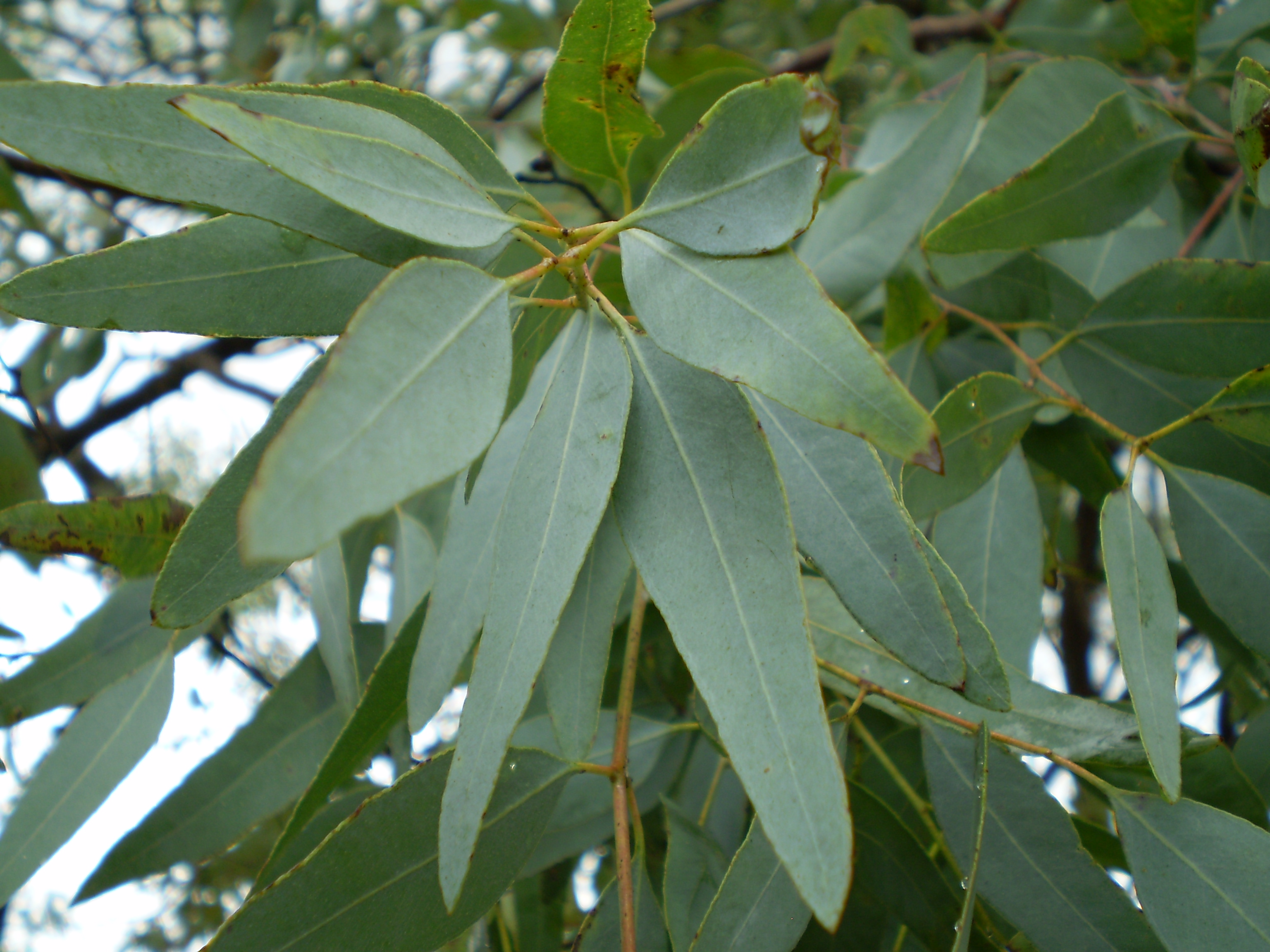
- Eucalyptus staigeriana leaf

Scientific classification
- Kingdom: Plantae
- Clade: Tracheophytes
- Clade: Angiosperms
- Clade: Eudicots
- Clade: Rosids
- Order: Myrtales
- Family: Myrtaceae
- Genus: Eucalyptus
- Species: E. staigeriana

Binomial name
- Eucalyptus staigeriana F.Muell. ex F.M.Bailey

Synonyms
- Eucalyptus crebra var. citrata F.Muell.

= Eucalyptus staigeriana =

Lemon-scented ironbark

Species of eucalyptus

Eucalyptus staigeriana, commonly known as the lemon-scented ironbark, is a species of small ironbark tree that is endemic to the Cape York Peninsula. It has rough ironbark on the trunk and branches, lance-shaped to egg-shaped leaves that smell of lemons when crushed, flower buds in groups of seven, white flowers and oval to spindle-shaped fruit.

== Description ==
Eucalyptus staigeriana is a tree that typically grows to a height of 12–21 m (39–69 ft) and forms a lignotuber. It has rough, dark grey or black ironbark on the trunk and branches. Young plants and coppice regrowth have greyish green to glaucous, egg-shaped leaves that are 38–70 mm (1.5–2.8 in) long and 20–40 mm (0.79–1.57 in) wide and petiolate. Adult leaves are arranged alternately, the same shade of dull-green to glaucous on both sides, lance-shaped to egg-shaped, 40–110 mm (1.6–4.3 in) long and 12–32 mm (0.47–1.26 in) wide on a petiole 4–14 mm (0.16–0.55 in) long. The leaves smell strongly of lemons when crushed. The flower buds are arranged on the ends of branchlets in groups of seven on a branched peduncle 7–16 mm (0.28–0.63 in) long, the individual buds on pedicels 2–6 mm (0.079–0.236 in) long. Mature buds are oval to spindle-shaped, 6–7 mm (0.24–0.28 in) long and 3–4 mm (0.12–0.16 in) wide with a conical to beaked operculum. Flowering occurs from December to February and the flowers are white. The fruit is a woody oval to spindle-shaped capsule 4–6 mm (0.16–0.24 in) long and 4–7 mm (0.16–0.28 in) wide with the valves near rim level or below it.

== Taxonomy and naming ==
Eucalyptus staigeriana was first formally described in 1883 by Frederick Manson Bailey from an unpublished description by Ferdinand von Mueller. The description was published in Bailey's book A Synopsis of the Queensland Flora. The specific epithet (staigeriana) honours Karl Theodore Staiger (1833-1888).

== Distribution and habitat ==
The lemon-scented ironbark grows in woodland and open forest in hilly country on the eastern side of the Cape York Peninsula.

== Conservation status ==
This eucalypt is classified as "least concern" under the Queensland Government Nature Conservation Act 1992.

== Uses ==
The complex essential oil is distilled from the leaves and used for flavouring, perfumery and aromatherapy. It has a fruity-lemon fragrance with rosemary-like back tones. E. staigeriana fresh weight leaves yield 2.9–3.4% essential oil. It contains a range of essential oil components, including geranial, methyl geranate, geranyl acetate, limonene, phellandrene, neral, terpinolene and geraniol.

Brazil and Guatemala are the major producers of Eucalyptus staigeriana oil, with Brazil producing up to 60 tonnes pa.
