= Terpene =

Class of oily organic compounds found in plants

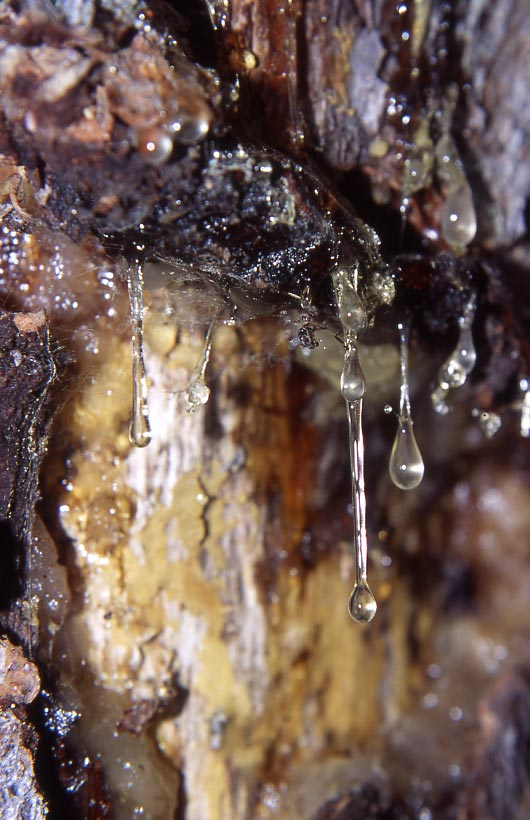
Many terpenes are derived commercially from conifer resins, such as those made by this pine.

Terpenes (/ˈtɜːrpiːnz/ TUR-peenz) are a large and diverse class of natural products with the general formula (C_{5}H_{8})_{n}, where n ≥ 2. They serve as crucial biosynthetic building blocks in many organisms, particularly plants. Comprising more than 30,000 compounds, these unsaturated hydrocarbons are produced predominantly by plants, particularly conifers. In plants, terpenes and terpenoids are important mediators of ecological interactions, while some insects use some terpenes as a form of defense. Other functions of terpenoids include cell growth modulation and plant elongation, light harvesting and photoprotection, and membrane permeability and fluidity control.

Terpenes are classified by the number of carbons: monoterpenes (C_{10}), sesquiterpenes (C_{15}), diterpenes (C_{20}), as examples. The terpene alpha-pinene is a major component of turpentine, a common solvent.

One terpene that has major applications is natural rubber (i.e., polyisoprene). The possibility that other terpenes could be used as precursors to produce synthetic polymers has been investigated. Many terpenes have been shown to have pharmacological effects. Terpenes are also components of some traditional medicines, such as aromatherapy, and as active ingredients of pesticides in agriculture.

== History and terminology ==
The term Terpen (German) was coined in 1866 by the German chemist August Kekulé to denote all hydrocarbons having the empirical formula C_{10}H_{16}, of which camphene was one. Previously, many hydrocarbons having the empirical formula C_{10}H_{16} had been called "camphene", but many other hydrocarbons of the same composition had different names. Kekulé coined the term "Terpen" in order to reduce the confusion. The name is a shortened form of "Terpentin", the german word for "turpentine".

Although sometimes used interchangeably with "terpenes", terpenoids (or isoprenoids) are modified terpenes that contain additional functional groups, usually oxygen-containing. The terms terpenes and terpenoids are often used interchangeably, however. Furthermore, terpenes are produced from terpenoids and many terpenoids are produced from terpenes. Both have strong and often pleasant odors, which may protect their hosts or attract pollinators. The number of terpenes and terpenoids is estimated at 55,000 chemical entities.

The 1939 Nobel Prize in Chemistry was awarded to Leopold Ružička "for his work on polymethylenes and higher terpenes", "including the first chemical synthesis of male sex hormones."

== Biological function ==
Terpenes are major biosynthetic building blocks. Steroids, for example, are derivatives of the triterpene squalene. Terpenes and terpenoids are also the primary constituents of the essential oils of many types of plants and flowers. In plants, terpenes and terpenoids are important mediators of ecological interactions. For example, they play a role in plant defense against herbivory, disease resistance, attraction of mutualists such as pollinators, as well as potentially plant-plant communication. They appear to play roles as antifeedants. Other functions of terpenoids include cell growth modulation and plant elongation, light harvesting and photoprotection, and membrane permeability and fluidity control.

Higher amounts of terpenes are released by trees in warmer weather, where they may function as a natural mechanism of cloud seeding. The clouds reflect sunlight, allowing the forest temperature to regulate.

Some insects use some terpenes as a form of defense. For example, termites of the subfamily Nasutitermitinae ward off predatory insects through the use of a specialized mechanism called a fontanellar gun, which ejects a resinous mixture of terpenes.

== Applications ==
Structure of natural rubber, exhibiting the characteristic methyl group on the alkene group

One terpene that has major applications is natural rubber (i.e., polyisoprene). The possibility that other terpenes could be used as precursors to produce synthetic polymers has been investigated as an alternative to the use of petroleum-based feedstocks. However, few of these applications have been commercialized. Many other terpenes, however, have smaller scale commercial and industrial applications. For example, turpentine, a mixture of terpenes (e.g., pinene), obtained from the distillation of pine tree resin, is used as an organic solvent and as a chemical feedstock (mainly for the production of other terpenoids). Rosin, another by-product of conifer tree resin, is widely used as an ingredient in a variety of industrial products, such as inks, varnishes and adhesives. Rosin is also used by violinists (and players of similar bowed instruments) to increase friction on the bow hair, by ballet dancers on the soles of their shoes to maintain traction on the floor, by gymnasts to keep their grips while performing, and by baseball pitchers to improve their control of the baseball. Terpenes are widely used as fragrances and flavors in consumer products such as perfumes, cosmetics and cleaning products, as well as food and drink products. For example, the aroma and flavor of hops comes, in part, from sesquiterpenes (mainly α-humulene and β-caryophyllene), which affect beer quality. Some form hydroperoxides that are valued as catalysts in the production of polymers.

Many terpenes have been shown to have pharmacological effects, although most studies are from laboratory research, and clinical research in humans is preliminary. Terpenes are also components of some traditional medicines, such as aromatherapy.

Reflecting their defensive role in plants, terpenes are used as active ingredients of pesticides in agriculture.

Tetrahydrocannabinol, a terpenoid, not a terpene, is the active ingredient in marijuana.

== Physical and chemical properties ==
Terpenes are colorless, although impure samples are often yellow. Boiling points scale with molecular size: terpenes, sesquiterpenes, and diterpenes respectively at 110, 160, and 220 °C. Being highly non-polar, they are insoluble in water. Being hydrocarbons, they are highly flammable and have low specific gravity (float on water). They are tactilely light oils considerably less viscous than familiar vegetable oils like corn oil (28 cP), with viscosity ranging from 1 cP (à la water) to 6 cP. Terpenes are local irritants and can cause gastrointestinal disturbances if ingested.

Terpenoids (mono-, sesqui-, di-, etc.) have similar physical properties but tend to be more polar and hence slightly more soluble in water and somewhat less volatile than their terpene analogues. Highly polar derivatives of terpenoids are the glycosides, which are linked to sugars. These are water-soluble solids.

== Biosynthesis ==
Biosynthetic conversion of geranylpyrophosphate to the terpenes α-pinene and β-pinene and to the terpinoid α-terpineol.

=== Isoprene as the building block ===
Conceptually derived from isoprenes, the structures and formulae of terpenes follow the biogenetic isoprene rule or the C_{5} rule, as described in 1953 by Leopold Ružička and colleagues. The C_{5} isoprene units are provided in the form of dimethylallyl pyrophosphate (DMAPP) and isopentenyl pyrophosphate (IPP). DMAPP and IPP are structural isomers to each other. This pair of building blocks are produced by two distinct metabolic pathways: the mevalonate (MVA) pathway and the non-mevalonate (MEP) pathway. These two pathways are mutually exclusive in most organisms, except for some bacteria and land plants. In general, most archaea and eukaryotes use the MVA pathway, while bacteria mostly have the MEP pathway. IPP and DMAPP are final products of both MVA and MEP pathways and the relative abundance of these two isoprene units is enzymatically regulated in host organisms.

Organism	Pathways
Bacteria	MVA or MEP
Archaea	MVA
Green Algae	MEP
Plants	MVA and MEP
Animals	MVA
Fungi	MVA

==== Mevalonate pathway ====
This pathway conjugates three molecules of acetyl CoA.

The mevalonate (MVA) pathway is distributed in all three domains of life; archaea, bacteria and eukaryotes. The MVA pathway is universally distributed in archaea and non-photosynthetic eukaryotes, while the pathway is sparse in bacteria. In photosynthetic eukaryotes, some species possess the MVA pathway, while others have the MEP pathway or both MVA and MEP pathways. This is due to the acquisition of the MEP pathway by a common ancestor of Archaeplastida (algae + land plants) through the endosymbiosis of ancestral cyanobacteria that possessed the MEP pathway. The MVA and MEP pathways were selectively lost in individual photosynthetic lineages.

Also, the archaeal MVA pathway is not completely homologous to the eukaryotic MVA pathway. Instead, the eukaryotic MVA pathway is closer to the bacterial MVA pathway.

==== Non-mevalonate pathway ====
The non-mevalonate pathway or the 2-C-methyl-D-erythritol 4-phosphate (MEP) pathway starts with pyruvate and glyceraldehyde 3-phosphate (G3P) as the carbon source.

C_{5} IPP and C_{5} DMAPP are the end-products in either pathway and are the precursors of terpenoids with various carbon numbers (typically C_{5} to C_{40}), side chains of (bacterio)chlorophylls, hemes and quinones. Synthesis of all higher terpenoids proceeds via formation of geranyl pyrophosphate (GPP), farnesyl pyrophosphate (FPP), and geranylgeranyl pyrophosphate (GGPP).

=== Geranyl pyrophosphate phase and beyond ===
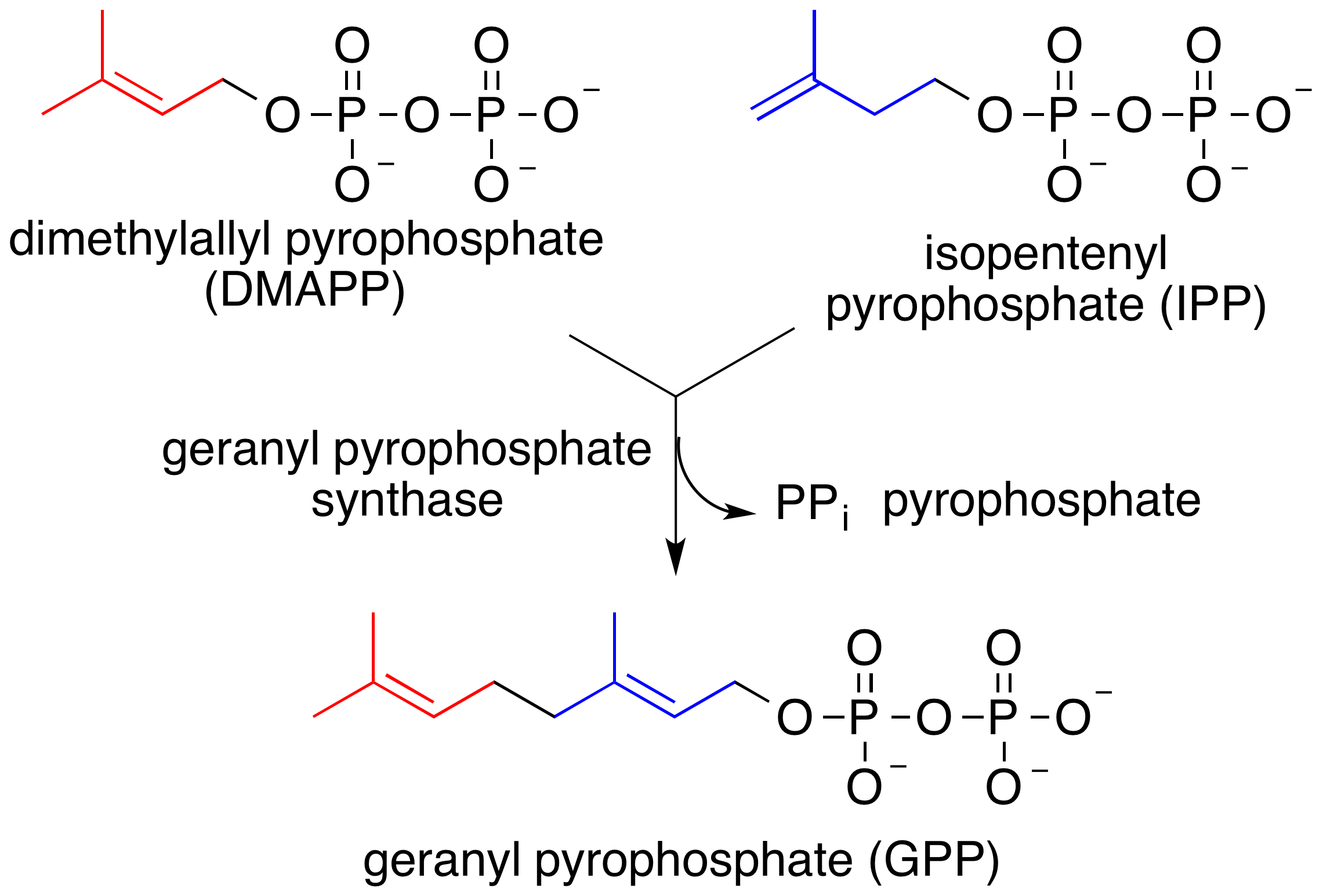
Isopentenyl pyrophosphate (IPP) and dimethylallyl pyrophosphate (DMAPP) condense to produce geranyl pyrophosphate, precursor to all terpenes and terpenoids.

In both MVA and MEP pathways, IPP is isomerized to DMAPP by the enzyme isopentenyl pyrophosphate isomerase. IPP and DMAPP condense to give geranyl pyrophosphate, the precursor to monoterpenes and monoterpenoids.

Geranyl pyrophosphate is also converted to farnesyl pyrophosphate and geranylgeranyl pyrophosphate, respectively C_{15} and C_{20} precursors to sesquiterpenes and diterpenes (as well as sesequiterpenoids and diterpenoids). Biosynthesis is mediated by terpene synthase.

=== Terpenes to terpenoids ===
The genomes of many plant species contain genes that encode terpenoid synthase enzymes imparting terpenes with their basic structure, and cytochrome P450s that modify this basic structure.

== Structure ==
Terpenes can be visualized as the result of linking isoprene (C_{5}H_{8}) units "head to tail" to form chains and rings. A few terpenes are linked “tail to tail”, and larger branched terpenes may be linked “tail to mid”.

=== Formula ===
Strictly speaking all monoterpenes have the same chemical formula C_{10}H_{16}. Similarly all sesquiterpenes and diterpenes have formulae of C_{15}H_{24} and C_{20}H_{32} respectively. The structural diversity of mono-, sesqui-, and diterpenes is a consequence of isomerism.

=== Chirality ===
Terpenes and terpenoids are usually chiral. Chiral compounds can exist as non-superposable mirror images, which exhibit distinct physical properties such as odor or toxicity.

==== Unsaturation ====
Most terpenes and terpenoids feature C=C groups, i.e. they exhibit unsaturation. Since they carry no functional groups aside from their unsaturation, terpenes are structurally distinctive. The unsaturation is associated with di- and trisubstituted alkenes. Di- and trisubstituted alkenes resist polymerization (low ceiling temperatures) but are susceptible to acid-induced carbocation formation.

=== Classification ===
Selected terpenes

Limonene, a monoterpene.

Carvone is a monoterpenoid, a modified monoterpene.

Pinene, a monoterpene which exists as two isomers, is a major consistituent of turpentine.

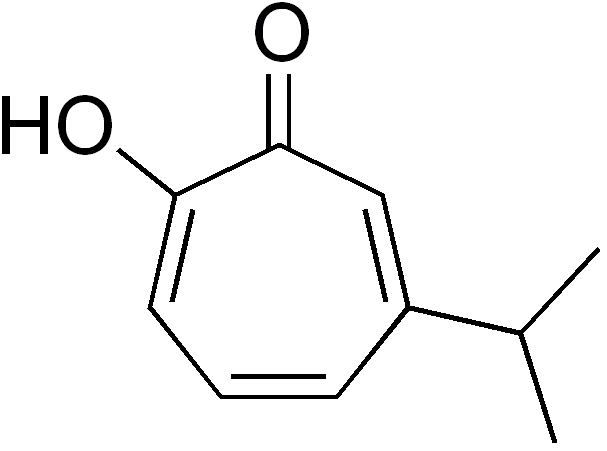
Hinokitiol is a monoterpenoid, a tropolone derivative.

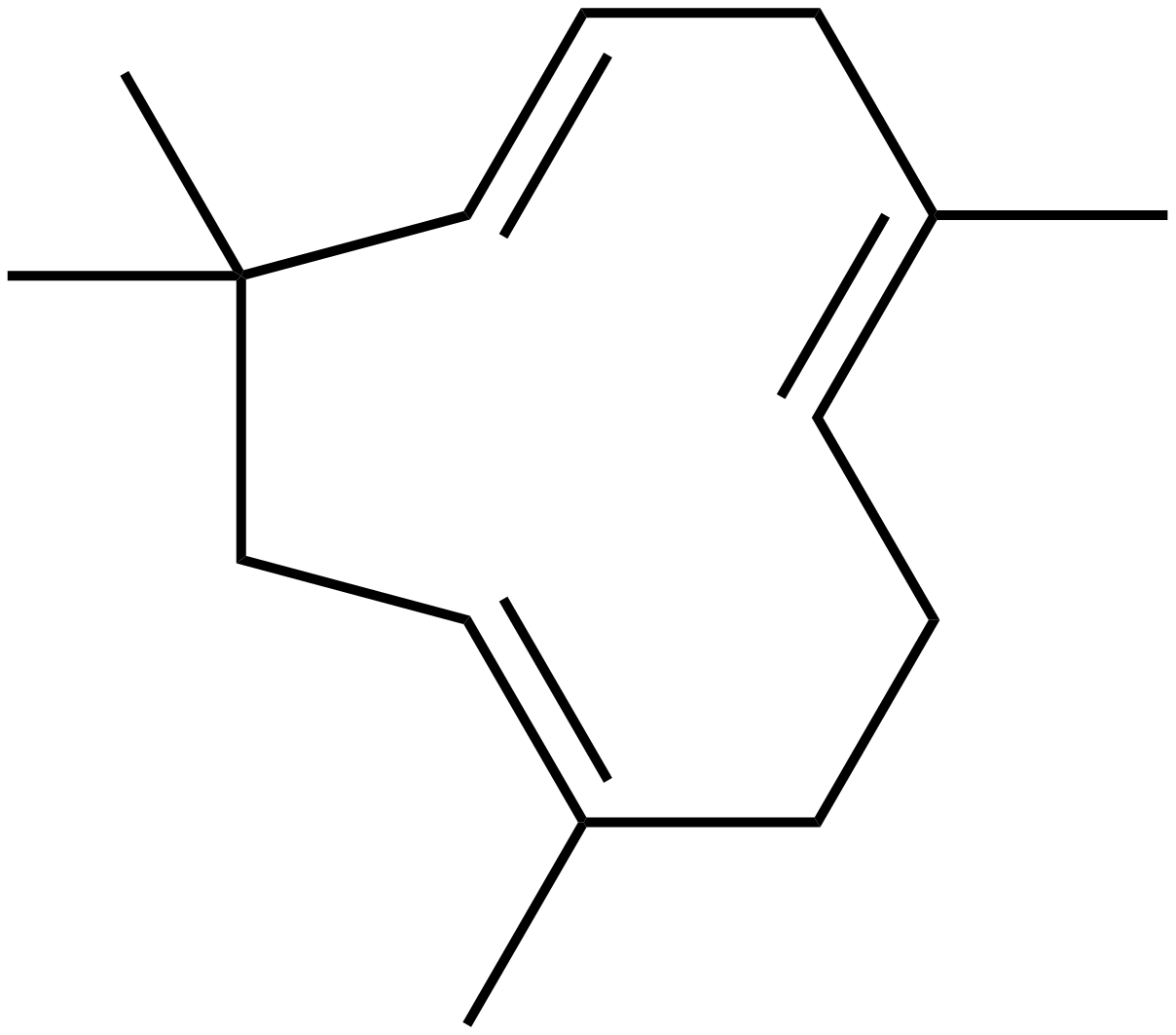
Humulene, a sesquiterpene.

Taxadiene, a diterpene, precursor to the diterpenoid taxol, an anticancer agent.

Squalene, a triterpene and universal precursor to natural steroids.

Geosmin is a sesquiterpenoid.

Terpenes may be classified by the number of isoprene units in the molecule; a prefix in the name indicates the number of isoprene pairs needed to assemble the molecule. Commonly, terpenes contain 2, 3, 4 or 6 isoprene units; the tetraterpenes (8 isoprene units) form a separate class of compounds called carotenoids; the others are rare.

- The basic unit isoprene itself is a hemiterpene. It may form oxygen-containing derivatives such as prenol and isovaleric acid analogous to terpenoids.
- Monoterpenes consist of two isoprene units and have the molecular formula C_{10}H_{16}. Examples of monoterpenes and monoterpenoids include geraniol, terpineol (present in lilacs), limonene (present in citrus fruits), myrcene (present in hops), linalool (present in lavender), hinokitiol (present in cypress trees) or pinene (present in pine trees). Iridoids derive from monoterpenes. Examples of iridoids include aucubin and catalpol.
- Sesquiterpenes consist of three isoprene units and have the molecular formula C_{15}H_{24}. Examples of sesquiterpenes and sesquiterpenoids include humulene, farnesenes, farnesol, geosmin. (The sesqui- prefix means one and a half.)
- Diterpenes are composed of four isoprene units and have the molecular formula C_{20}H_{32}. They derive from geranylgeranyl pyrophosphate. Examples of diterpenes and diterpenoids are cafestol, kahweol, cembrene and taxadiene (precursor of taxol). Diterpenes also form the basis for biologically important compounds such as retinol, retinal, and phytol.
- Sesterterpenes, terpenes having 25 carbons and five isoprene units, are rare relative to the other sizes. (The sester- prefix means two and a half.) An example of a sesterterpenoid is geranylfarnesol.
- Triterpenes consist of six isoprene units and have the molecular formula C_{30}H_{48}. The linear triterpene squalene, the major constituent of shark liver oil, is derived from the reductive coupling of two molecules of farnesyl pyrophosphate. Squalene is then processed biosynthetically to generate either lanosterol or cycloartenol, the structural precursors to all the steroids.
- Sesquarterpenes are composed of seven isoprene units and have the molecular formula C_{35}H_{56}. Sesquarterpenes are typically microbial in their origin. Examples of sesquarterpenoids are ferrugicadiol and tetraprenylcurcumene.
- Tetraterpenes contain eight isoprene units and have the molecular formula C_{40}H_{64}. Biologically important tetraterpenoids include the acyclic lycopene, the monocyclic gamma-carotene, and the bicyclic alpha- and beta-carotenes.
- Polyterpenes consist of long chains of many isoprene units. Natural rubber consists of polyisoprene in which the double bonds are cis. Some plants produce a polyisoprene with trans double bonds, known as gutta-percha.
- Norisoprenoids, characterized by the shortening of a chain or ring by the removal of a methylene group or substitution of one or more methyl side chains by hydrogen atoms. These include the C_{13}-norisoprenoid 3-oxo-α-ionol present in Muscat of Alexandria leaves and 7,8-dihydroionone derivatives, such as megastigmane-3,9-diol and 3-oxo-7,8-dihydro-α-ionol found in Shiraz leaves (both grapes in the species Vitis vinifera) or wine (responsible for some of the spice notes in Chardonnay), can be produced by fungal peroxidases or glycosidases.

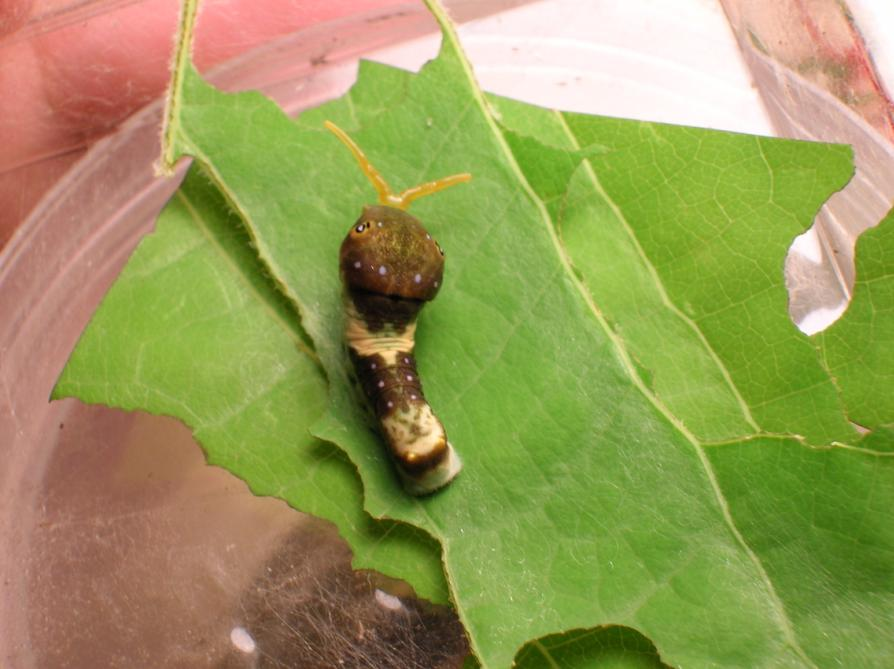
Second- or third-instar caterpillars of Genus Papilio butterflies, like this Papilio glaucus, emit terpenes from their osmeterium.

== Industrial syntheses ==
While terpenes and terpenoids occur widely, their extraction from natural sources is often problematic. Consequently, they are produced by chemical synthesis, usually from petrochemicals. In one route, acetone and acetylene are condensed to give 2-Methylbut-3-yn-2-ol, which is extended with acetoacetic ester to give geranyl alcohol. Others are prepared from those terpenes and terpenoids that are readily isolated in quantity, say from the paper and tall oil industries. For example, α-pinene, which is readily obtainable from natural sources, is converted to citronellal and camphor. Citronellal is also converted to rose oxide and menthol.

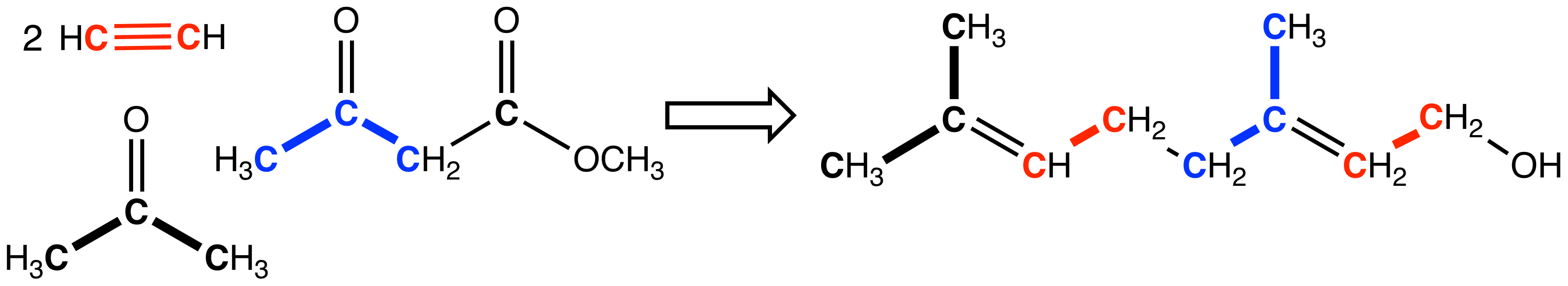
Summary of an industrial route to geranyl alcohol from simple reagents
