= Farnesyl diphosphatase =

Identifiers
- EC no.: 3.1.7.6

Databases
- BRENDA: enzyme data
- ExPASy: NiceZyme view
- KEGG: enzyme entry
- MetaCyc: metabolic pathway
- Rhea: reactions
- PDB structures: RCSB PDB PDBe PDBsum
Search
- PMC: articles
- PubMed: articles
- NCBI: proteins

Farnesyl diphosphatase (EC 3.1.7.6, FPP phosphatase) is an enzyme with systematic name (2E,6E)-farnesyl-diphosphate diphosphohydrolase. It catalyses the reaction

farnesyl pyrophosphate
H_{2}O
PP_{i}
(2E,6E) farnesol

The enzyme characterised from Saccharomyces cerevisiae and rats hydrolyses farnesyl pyrophosphate to (2E,6E) farnesol and pyrophosphate (PP_{i}). The reaction is part of the biosynthesis of acyclic sesquiterpenoids.
