= Farnesyltranstransferase =

Class of enzymes

Identifiers
- EC no.: 2.5.1.29
- CAS no.: 9032-58-0

Databases
- IntEnz: IntEnz view
- BRENDA: BRENDA entry
- ExPASy: NiceZyme view
- KEGG: KEGG entry
- MetaCyc: metabolic pathway
- PRIAM: profile
- PDB structures: RCSB PDB PDBe PDBsum
- Gene Ontology: AmiGO / QuickGO
Search
- PMC: articles
- PubMed: articles
- NCBI: proteins

Farnesyltranstransferase (EC 2.5.1.29) is an enzyme characterised from pig liver that catalyzes a chemical reaction in the biosynthesis of the diterpenoid alcohol, geranylgeraniol, via its pyrophosphate derivative. The two substrates of the enzyme are farnesyl pyrophosphate and isopentenyl pyrophosphate. These combine to give geranylgeranyl pyrophosphate, with pyrophosphate (PP_{i}) as a byproduct.

farnesyl pyrophosphate
+
isopentenyl pyrophosphate
PP_{i}
geranylgeranyl pyrophosphate

This enzyme belongs to the family of transferases, specifically those transferring aryl or alkyl groups other than methyl groups. The systematic name of this enzyme class is trans,trans-farnesyl-diphosphate:isopentenyl-diphosphate farnesyltranstransferase. Other names in common use include geranylgeranyl-diphosphate synthase, geranylgeranyl pyrophosphate synthetase, geranylgeranyl-PP synthetase, farnesyltransferase, and geranylgeranyl pyrophosphate synthase.

This protein may use the morpheein model of allosteric regulation.

== Structural studies ==
As of late 2007, two structures have been solved for this class of enzymes, with PDB accession codes PDB: 2DH4 and PDB: 2Q80.

== Inhibitors ==
A number of farnesyltranstransferase inhibitors including darlifarnib, lonafarnib, and tipifarnib have been evaulated as treatments of cancer and other indications.
