= Smenospongia aurea =

Scientific classification
- Domain: Eukaryota
- Kingdom: Animalia
- Phylum: Porifera
- Class: Demospongiae
- Order: Dictyoceratida
- Family: Thorectidae
- Genus: Smenospongia
- Species: S. aurea

Binomial name
- Smenospongia aurea (Hyatt, 1875)

Synonyms
- List: Aplysina aurea Hyatt, 1875; Stelospongos cribriformis var. stabilis Hyatt, 1877; Stelospongos cribriformis var. typica Hyatt, 1877; Verongia aurea Hyatt, 1875

Species of sponge

Smenospongia aurea is a species of sea sponge found in the Caribbean in the class Demospongiae. The scientific name of the species was first validly published in 1875 by Alpheus Hyatt, as Aplysina aurea.

== See also ==
- Smenospongia echina
- 5-Bromo-DMT
- Hallucinogenic fish
