= Geranylacetone =

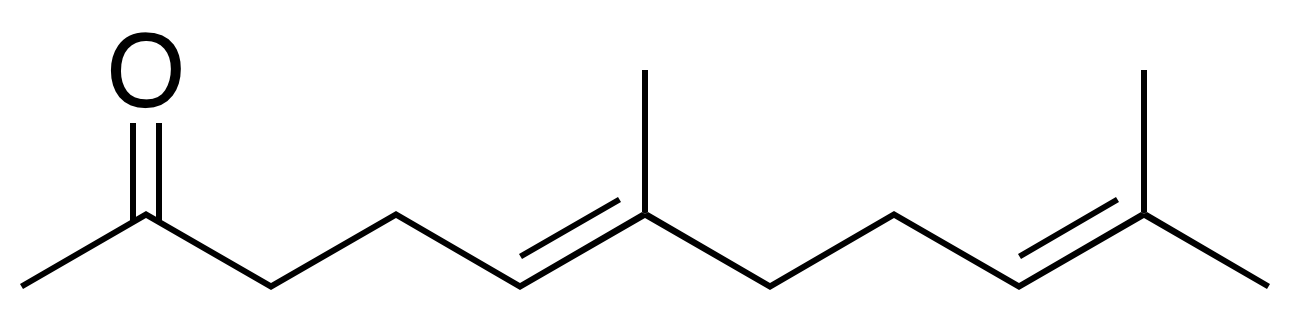

Names
- Preferred IUPAC name (5E)-6,10-Dimethylundeca-5,9-dien-2-one
- Other names 6,10-dimethyl-(5E)-5,9-undecadien-2-one, (E)-geranylacetone

Identifiers
CAS Number	3796-70-1
3D model (JSmol)	Interactive image
ChEBI	CHEBI:67206
ChemSpider	1266569
ECHA InfoCard	100.021.155
EC Number	223-269-8
PubChem CID	1549778
UNII	9B7RY79U9Z
CompTox Dashboard (EPA)	DTXSID4052053
- InChI: InChI=1S/C13H22O/c1-11(2)7-5-8-12(3)9-6-10-13(4)14/h7,9H,5-6,8,10H2,1-4H3/b12-9+ Key: HNZUNIKWNYHEJJ-FMIVXFBMSA-N
- SMILES: CC(=CCC/C(=C/CCC(=O)C)/C)C

Properties
Chemical formula	C_{13}H_{22}O
Molar mass	194.318 g·mol^{−1}
Density	0.8698 g/cm^{3} (20 °C)
Boiling point	126–8 °C (259–46 °F; 399–281 K) 10 mm Hg

Hazards
- GHS labelling
Pictograms	(GHS07: Exclamation mark) (GHS09: Environmental hazard)
Signal word	Warning
Hazard statements	H315, H411
Precautionary statements	P264, P273, P280, P302+P352, P321, P332+P313, P362, P391, P501
- Except where otherwise noted, data are given for materials in their standard state (at 25 °C [77 °F], 100 kPa). Infobox references

Geranylacetone is an organic compound with the formula CH_{3}C(O)(CH_{2})_{2}CH=C(CH_{3})(CH_{2})_{2}CH=C(CH_{3})_{2}. A colorless oil, it is the product of coupling geranyl and acetonyl groups. It is a precursor to synthetic squalene.

== Synthesis and occurrence ==
Geranylacetone can be produced by transesterification of ethyl acetoacetate with linalool:

EtOC(O)CH_{2}C(O)CH_{3} + C_{10}H_{17}OH → C_{10}H_{17}OC(O)CH_{2}C(O)CH_{3} + EtOH

The esterification of linalool can also be effected with ketene or isopropenyl methyl ether. The resulting linally ester undergoes Carroll rearrangement to give geranylacetone. Geranyl acetone is a precursor to isophytol, which is used in the manufacture of Vitamin E. Other derivatives of geranyl acetone are farnesol and nerolidol.

Geranylacetone is a flavor component of many plants including rice, mango, and tomatoes.

Together with other ketones, geranylacetone results from the degradation of vegetable matter by ozone.

== Biosynthesis ==
It arises by the oxidation of certain carotenoids. Such reaction are catalyzed by carotenoid oxygenase.
