= Farnesol dehydrogenase =

farnesol dehydrogenase

Identifiers
- EC no.: 1.1.1.216
- CAS no.: 90804-55-0

Databases
- IntEnz: IntEnz view
- BRENDA: BRENDA entry
- ExPASy: NiceZyme view
- KEGG: KEGG entry
- MetaCyc: metabolic pathway
- PRIAM: profile
- PDB structures: RCSB PDB PDBe PDBsum
- Gene Ontology: AmiGO / QuickGO
Search
- PMC: articles
- PubMed: articles
- NCBI: proteins

In enzymology, a farnesol dehydrogenase (EC 1.1.1.216) is an enzyme that catalyzes the chemical reaction

2-trans,6-trans-farnesol + NADP^{+} $\rightleftharpoons$ 2-trans,6-trans-farnesal + NADPH + H^{+}

Thus, the two substrates of this enzyme are 2-trans,6-trans-farnesol and NADP^{+}, whereas its 3 products are 2-trans,6-trans-farnesal, NADPH, and H^{+}.

This enzyme belongs to the family of oxidoreductases, specifically those acting on the CH-OH group of donor with NAD^{+} or NADP^{+} as acceptor. The systematic name of this enzyme class is 2-trans,6-trans-farnesol:NADP^{+} 1-oxidoreductase. Other names in common use include NADP^{+}-farnesol dehydrogenase, and farnesol (nicotinamide adenine dinucleotide phosphate) dehydrogenase.
