= Farnesyl-diphosphate kinase =

farnesyl diphosphate kinase

Identifiers
- EC no.: 2.7.4.18
- CAS no.: 50936-43-1

Databases
- IntEnz: IntEnz view
- BRENDA: BRENDA entry
- ExPASy: NiceZyme view
- KEGG: KEGG entry
- MetaCyc: metabolic pathway
- PRIAM: profile
- PDB structures: RCSB PDB PDBe PDBsum
- Gene Ontology: AmiGO / QuickGO
Search
- PMC: articles
- PubMed: articles
- NCBI: proteins

In enzymology, a farnesyl-diphosphate kinase (EC 2.7.4.18) is an enzyme that catalyzes the chemical reaction

ATP + farnesyl diphosphate $\rightleftharpoons$ ADP + farnesyl triphosphate

Thus, the two substrates of this enzyme are ATP and farnesyl diphosphate, whereas its two products are ADP and farnesyl triphosphate.

This enzyme belongs to the family of transferases, specifically those transferring phosphorus-containing groups (phosphotransferases) with a phosphate group as acceptor. The systematic name of this enzyme class is ATP:farnesyl-diphosphate phosphotransferase. This enzyme is also called farnesyl pyrophosphate kinase.
