= Farnesylcysteine lyase =

Enzyme

Identifiers
- EC no.: 1.8.3.6

Databases
- IntEnz: IntEnz view
- BRENDA: BRENDA entry
- ExPASy: NiceZyme view
- KEGG: KEGG entry
- MetaCyc: metabolic pathway
- PRIAM: profile
- PDB structures: RCSB PDB PDBe PDBsum
Search
- PMC: articles
- PubMed: articles
- NCBI: proteins

Farnesylcysteine lyase (EC 1.8.3.6, FC lyase, FCLY) is an enzyme with systematic name S-(2E,6E)-farnesyl-L-cysteine oxidase. This enzyme catalyses the following chemical reaction

S-(2E,6E)-farnesyl-L-cysteine + O_{2} + H_{2}O $\rightleftharpoons$ (2E,6E)-farnesal + L-cysteine + H_{2}O_{2}

Farnesylcysteine lyase is a flavoprotein (FAD).
