= Tritrans,polycis-undecaprenyl-diphosphate synthase (geranylgeranyl-diphosphate specific) =

Identifiers
- EC no.: 2.5.1.89

Databases
- IntEnz: IntEnz view
- BRENDA: BRENDA entry
- ExPASy: NiceZyme view
- KEGG: KEGG entry
- MetaCyc: metabolic pathway
- PRIAM: profile
- PDB structures: RCSB PDB PDBe PDBsum
Search
- PMC: articles
- PubMed: articles
- NCBI: proteins

Tritrans,polycis-undecaprenyl-diphosphate synthase (geranylgeranyl-diphosphate specific) (EC 2.5.1.89) is an enzyme with systematic name geranylgeranyl-diphosphate:isopentenyl-diphosphate cistransferase (adding 7 isopentenyl units). This enzyme catalyses the following chemical reaction

geranylgeranyl diphosphate + 7 isopentenyl diphosphate $\rightleftharpoons$ 7 diphosphate + tritrans,heptacis-undecaprenyl diphosphate

This enzyme is involved in the biosynthesis of the glycosyl carrier lipid in some archaebacteria.
