= Alpha-humulene 10-hydroxylase =

Class of enzymes

Identifiers
- EC no.: 1.14.13.150

Databases
- IntEnz: IntEnz view
- BRENDA: BRENDA entry
- ExPASy: NiceZyme view
- KEGG: KEGG entry
- MetaCyc: metabolic pathway
- PRIAM: profile
- PDB structures: RCSB PDB PDBe PDBsum
Search
- PMC: articles
- PubMed: articles
- NCBI: proteins

Alpha-humulene 10-hydroxylase (EC 1.14.13.150, CYP71BA1) is an enzyme with systematic name alpha-humulene,NADPH:oxygen 10-oxidoreductase. This enzyme catalyses the following chemical reaction

alpha-humulene + O_{2} + NADPH + H^{+} $\rightleftharpoons$ 10-hydroxy-alpha-humulene + NADP^{+} + H_{2}O

Alpha-humulene 10-hydroxylase requires cytochrome P-450.
