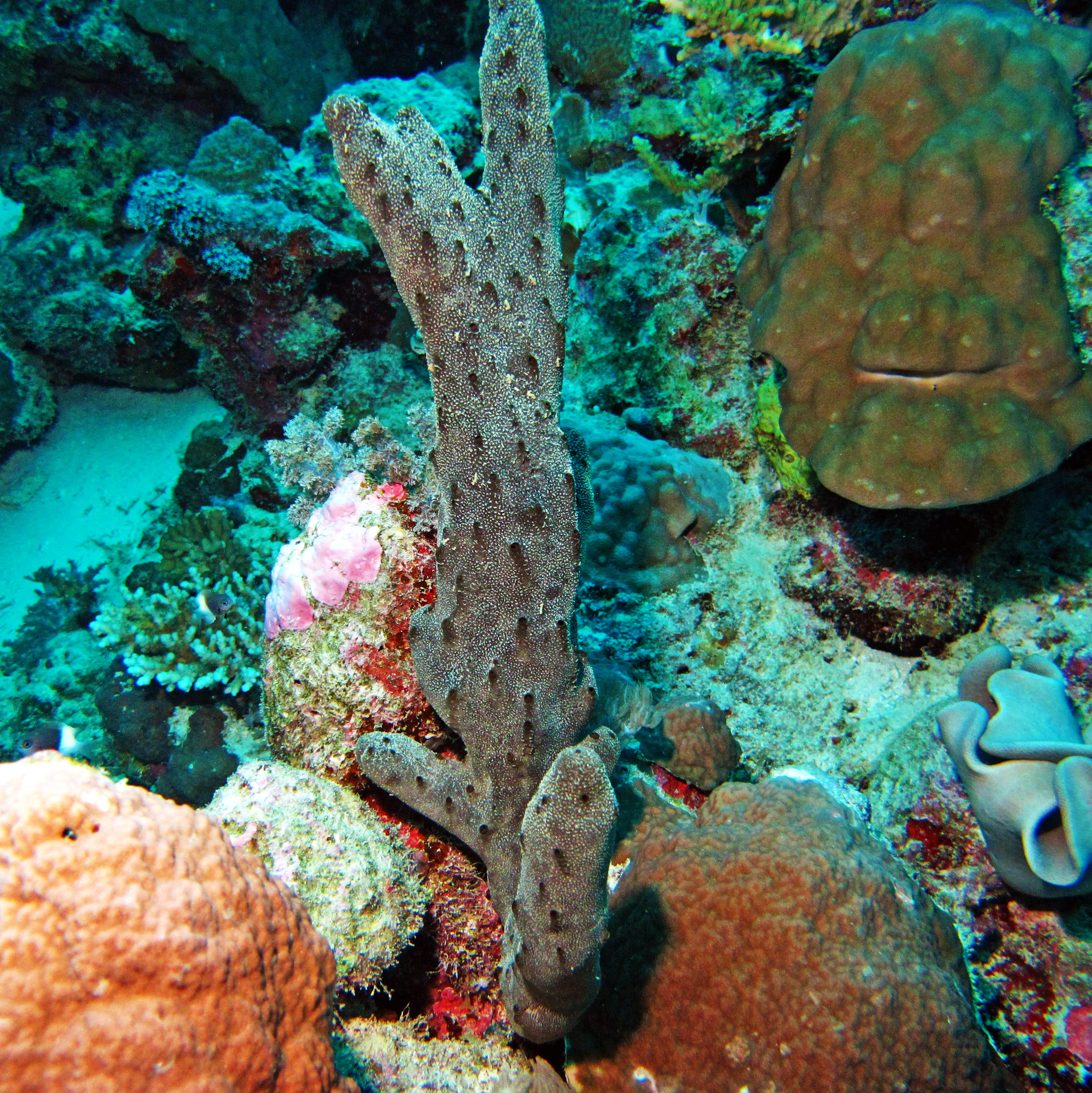
- Hyrtios erectus, Sudan, Red Sea

Scientific classification
- Kingdom: Animalia
- Phylum: Porifera
- Class: Demospongiae
- Order: Dictyoceratida
- Family: Thorectidae
- Genus: Hyrtios
- Species: H. erectus

Binomial name
- Hyrtios erectus (Keller, 1889)

= Hyrtios erectus =

Species of sponge

Hyrtios erectus is a species of sponge in the taxonomic classification of the common sponges Demospongiae. The sponge belongs to the genus Hyrtios and belongs to the family Thorectidae. The scientific name of this species was first validly published in 1889 by Conrad Keller.

== Distribution ==
This species is widespread in Indo-west Pacific, also in the Southern Red Sea, Papua New Guinea, Palau, New Caledonia, South China Sea, Indonesia and Queensland, South Australia.

== Description ==
The body of this sponge consists of fibers and is able to absorb a lot of water.

== Biology ==
These tropical hermaphroditic sponges can reach a depth range of 0 – 100 m. They are filter-feeders living attached to a substrate at base of pinnacles.

== Bibliography ==
- Keller, C. (1889). Die Spongienfauna des rothen Meeres (I. Hälfte). Zeitschrift für wissenschaftliche Zoologie. 48: 311–405, pls XX-XXV
- Row, R.W.H. 1911. Reports on the Marine Biology of the Sudanese Red Sea.—XIX. Report on the Sponges collected by Mr. Cyril Crossland in 1904‐5. Part II. Non‐Calcarea. Journal of the Linnean Society of London. Zoology 31(208): 287–400. DOI: 10.1111/j.1096-3642.1911.tb00461.x
- Bergquist, P.R. 1965. The sponges of Micronesia, Part I. The Palau Archipelago. Pacific Science 19: 123-204 34 figs [129]
- Bergquist, P.R. 1980. A revision of the supraspecific classification of the orders Dictyoceratida, Dendroceratida and Verongida (Class Demospongiae). New Zealand Journal of Zoology 7: 443-503 figs 1-25 pls [456]
