= Geranylgeranyl diphosphate reductase =

Class of enzymes

Identifiers
- EC no.: 1.3.1.83

Databases
- IntEnz: IntEnz view
- BRENDA: BRENDA entry
- ExPASy: NiceZyme view
- KEGG: KEGG entry
- MetaCyc: metabolic pathway
- PRIAM: profile
- PDB structures: RCSB PDB PDBe PDBsum
Search
- PMC: articles
- PubMed: articles
- NCBI: proteins

Geranylgeranyl diphosphate reductase (EC 1.3.1.83, geranylgeranyl reductase, CHL P) is an enzyme with systematic name geranylgeranyl-diphosphate:NADP^{+} oxidoreductase. This enzyme catalyses the following chemical reaction

geranylgeranyl pyrophosphate
+ 3 NADPH
3 H^{+}
3 H^{+}
phytyl diphosphate
+ 3 NADP^{+}

The substrate of this enzyme is geranylgeranyl pyrophosphate, which reacts with three equivalents of reduced nicotinamide adenine dinucleotide phosphate (NADPH), and three protons. The product is phytyl diphosphate and oxidised NADP^{+}. It can also act on geranylgeranyl-chlorophyll a.
