= Geranylgeranylglycerol-phosphate geranylgeranyltransferase =

InterPro Family

geranylgeranylglycerol-phosphate geranylgeranyltransferase

Identifiers
- EC no.: 2.5.1.42
- CAS no.: 124650-68-6

Databases
- IntEnz: IntEnz view
- BRENDA: BRENDA entry
- ExPASy: NiceZyme view
- KEGG: KEGG entry
- MetaCyc: metabolic pathway
- PRIAM: profile
- PDB structures: RCSB PDB PDBe PDBsum
- Gene Ontology: AmiGO / QuickGO
Search
- PMC: articles
- PubMed: articles
- NCBI: proteins

In enzymology, a geranylgeranylglycerol-phosphate geranylgeranyltransferase (EC 2.5.1.42) is an enzyme that catalyzes the chemical reaction

geranylgeranyl diphosphate + sn-3-O-(geranylgeranyl)glycerol 1-phosphate $\rightleftharpoons$ diphosphate + 2,3-bis-O-(geranylgeranyl)glycerol 1-phosphate

Thus, the two substrates of this enzyme are geranylgeranyl diphosphate and sn-3-O-(geranylgeranyl)glycerol 1-phosphate, whereas its two products are diphosphate and 2,3-bis-O-(geranylgeranyl)glycerol 1-phosphate.

This enzyme belongs to the family of transferases, specifically those transferring aryl groups or alkyl groups other than methyl groups. The systematic name of this enzyme class is geranylgeranyl diphosphate:sn-3-O-(geranylgeranyl)glycerol 1-phosphate geranylgeranyltransferase. Other names in common use include geranylgeranyloxyglycerol phosphate geranylgeranyltransferase, and geranylgeranyltransferase II.

== Structural studies ==
As of late 2007, two structures have been solved for this class of enzymes, with PDB accession codes 2F6U and 2F6X.
