= Fascaplysin =

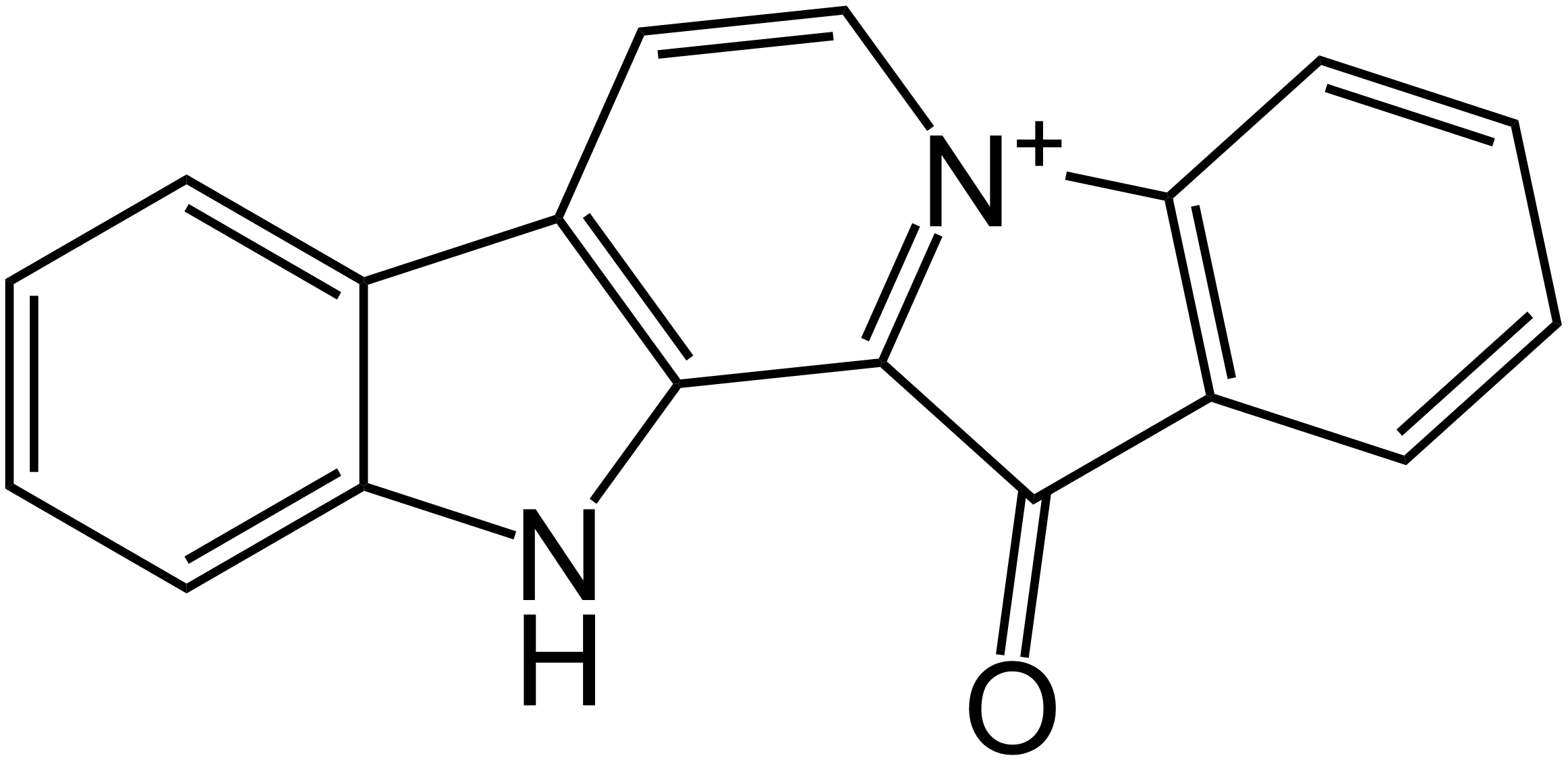

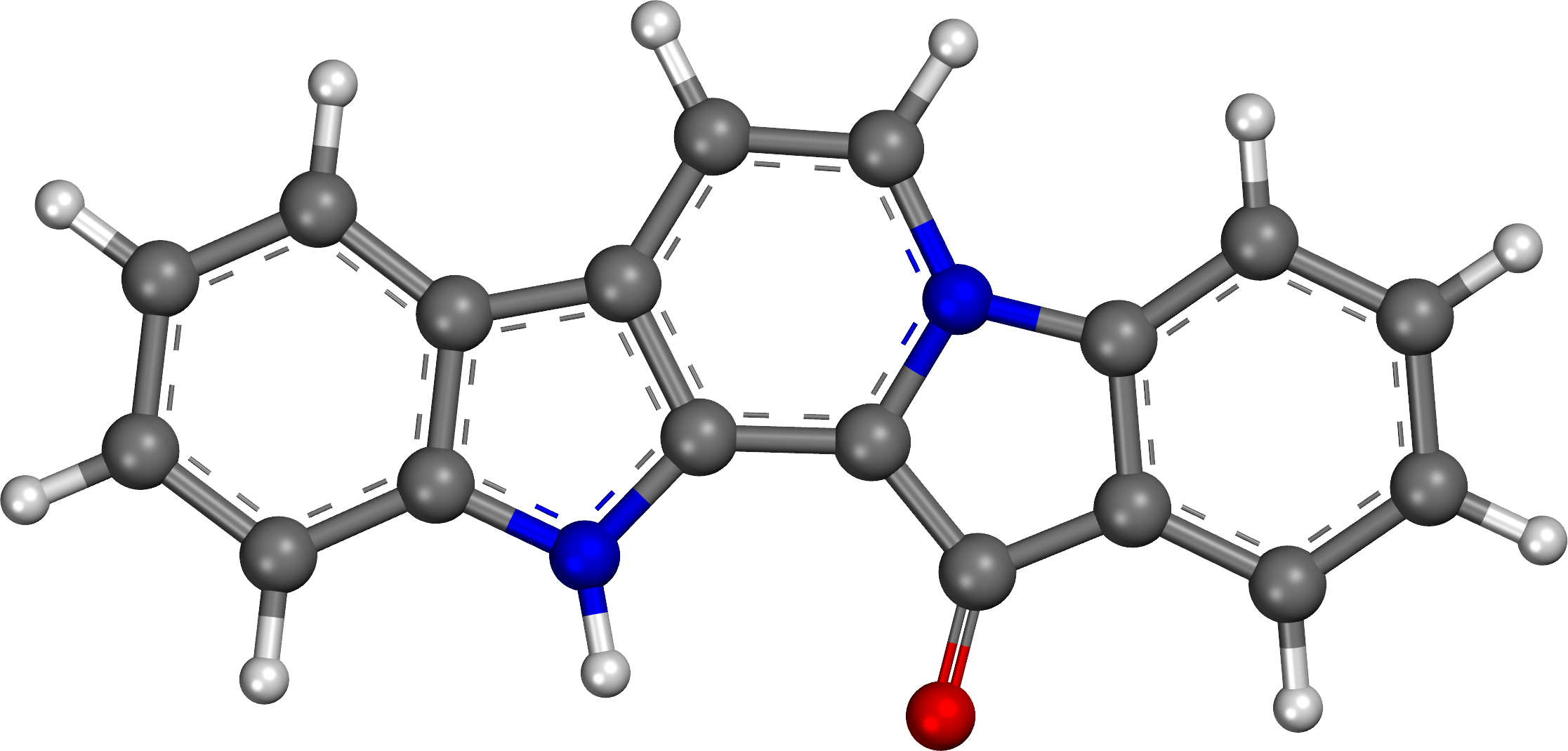

Names
- IUPAC name 13-Oxo-12,13-dihydrobenzo[2,3]indolizino[8,7-b]indol-5-ium
- Other names LSM-4272

Identifiers
CAS Number	114719-57-2
3D model (JSmol)	Interactive image
ChEBI	CHEBI:93765
ChEMBL	ChEMBL602937
ChemSpider	66033
IUPHAR/BPS	5969
PubChem CID	73293
- InChI: InChI=1S/C11H8N2/c1-2-4-10-8(3-1)9-5-6-12-7-11(9)13-10/h1-7,13H Key: WYQIPCUPNMRAKP-UHFFFAOYSA-O; InChI=1S/C18H10N2O/c21-18-13-6-2-4-8-15(13)20-10-9-12-11-5-1-3-7-14(11)19-16(12)17(18)20/h1-10H/p+1 Key: WYQIPCUPNMRAKP-UHFFFAOYSA-O
- SMILES: C1=CC=C2C(=C1)C3=C(N2)C4=[N+](C=C3)C5=CC=CC=C5C4=O

Properties
Chemical formula	C_{18}H_{11}N_{2}O^{+}
Molar mass	271.298 g·mol^{−1}
- Except where otherwise noted, data are given for materials in their standard state (at 25 °C [77 °F], 100 kPa). Infobox references

Fascaplysin is a marine alkaloid based on 12H-pyrido[1–2-a:3,4-b′]diindole ring system. It was first isolated as a red pigment from the marine sponge Fascaplysinopsis reticulata that was collected in the South Pacific near Fiji in 1988. Fascaplysin possesses a broad range of in vitro biological activities including analgesic, antimicrobial, antifungal, antiviral, antimalarial, anti-angiogenic, and antiproliferative activity against numerous cancer cell lines.

== Synthesis ==
The first total synthesis of fascaplysin was performed in seven steps from indole in 1990. Fascaplysin and its derivatives can be synthesized from tryptamine, beta-carboline, indoleketones, and indigo.
