= Smenospongia echina =

Scientific classification
- Kingdom: Animalia
- Phylum: Porifera
- Class: Demospongiae
- Order: Dictyoceratida
- Family: Thorectidae
- Genus: Smenospongia
- Species: S. echina

Binomial name
- Smenospongia echina (Laubenfels, 1934)

Synonyms
- Polyfibrospongia echina Laubenfels, 1934

Species of sponge

Smenospongia echina is a species of sea sponge in the class Demospongiae. The scientific name of the species was first validly published in 1934 by Max Walker de Laubenfels, as Polyfibrospongia echina.

== See also ==
- Smenospongia aurea
- 5-Bromo-DMT
- Hallucinogenic fish
