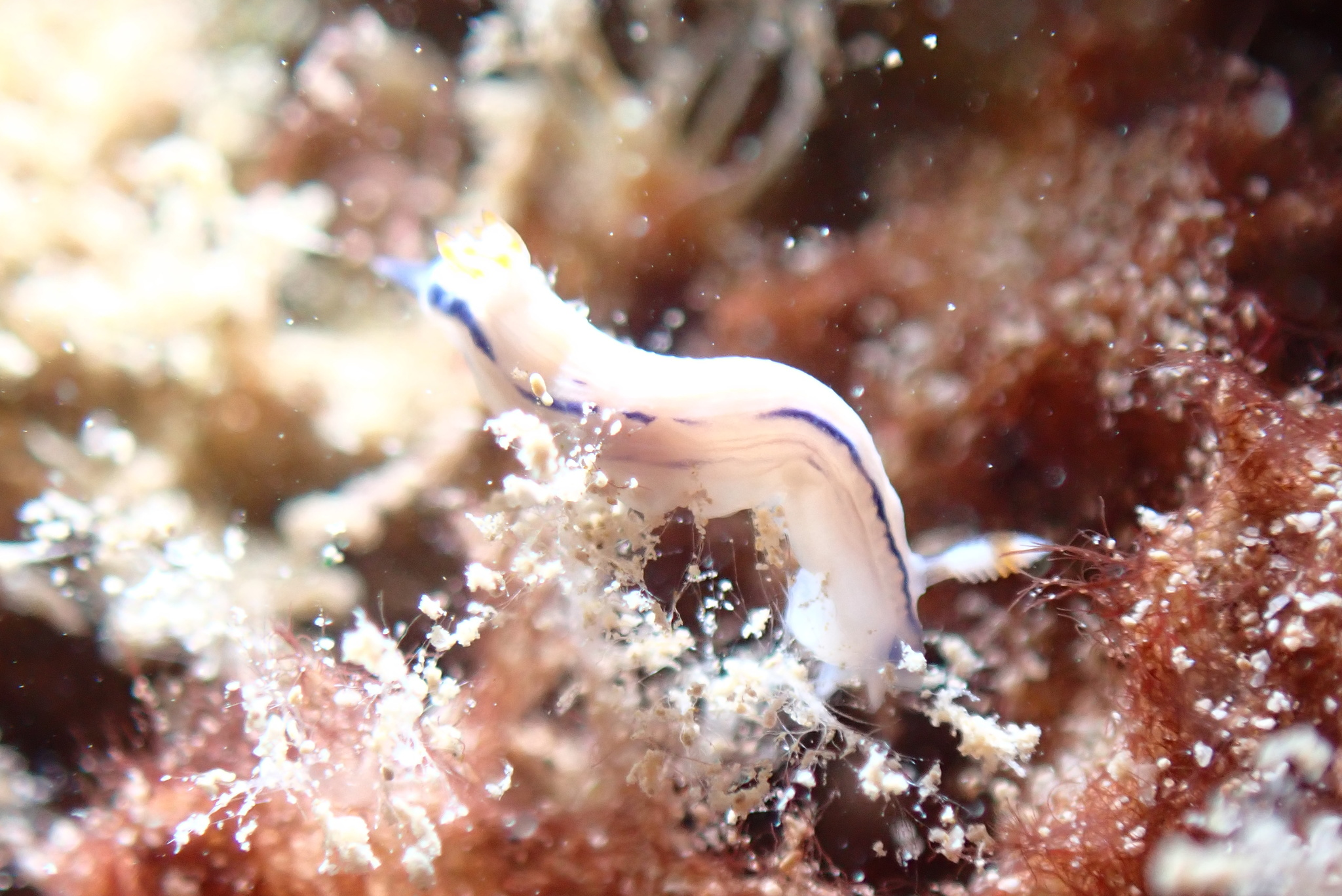

Scientific classification
- Kingdom: Animalia
- Phylum: Mollusca
- Class: Gastropoda
- Order: Nudibranchia
- Family: Chromodorididae
- Genus: Hypselodoris
- Species: H. peasei

Binomial name
- Hypselodoris peasei (Bergh, 1880)

Synonyms
- Doris prismatica var. lineata Pease, 1860; Hypselodoris andersoni Bertsch and S. Johnson, 1989

= Hypselodoris peasei =

Species of gastropod

Hypselodoris peasei is a species of sea slug or dorid nudibranch, a marine gastropod mollusk in the family Chromodorididae.

== Taxonomy ==
This species was originally named Doris prismatica var. lineata Pease, 1860, but lineata was already used for Doris lineata Eydoux and Souleyet, 1852, so Bergh (1880) provided the replacement name Chromodoris peasei. Bertsch and Gosliner (1989) erected the name Hypselodoris andersoni for the locust nudibranch, unaware of Bergh's earlier name. However, Rudman (2000) recognized that C. peasei matched the description of H. andersoni and Epstein et al., (2018) formalized the priority of Hypselodoris peasei over H. andersoni.

== Distribution ==
This nudibranch is known only from the Hawaiian islands of Oahu and Maui in the central Pacific Ocean.

== Description ==
Hypselodoris peasei has a translucent white body with longitudinal opaque white lines and a blue mantle edge and foot. There are often black specks present on the upper dorsum. The gills and rhinophores are white, with two orange bands. It is similar to Hypselodoris bertschi and has been confused with this species in the past. This species can reach a total length of at least 20 mm and has been observed feeding on yellow sponges from the genus Luffariella.
