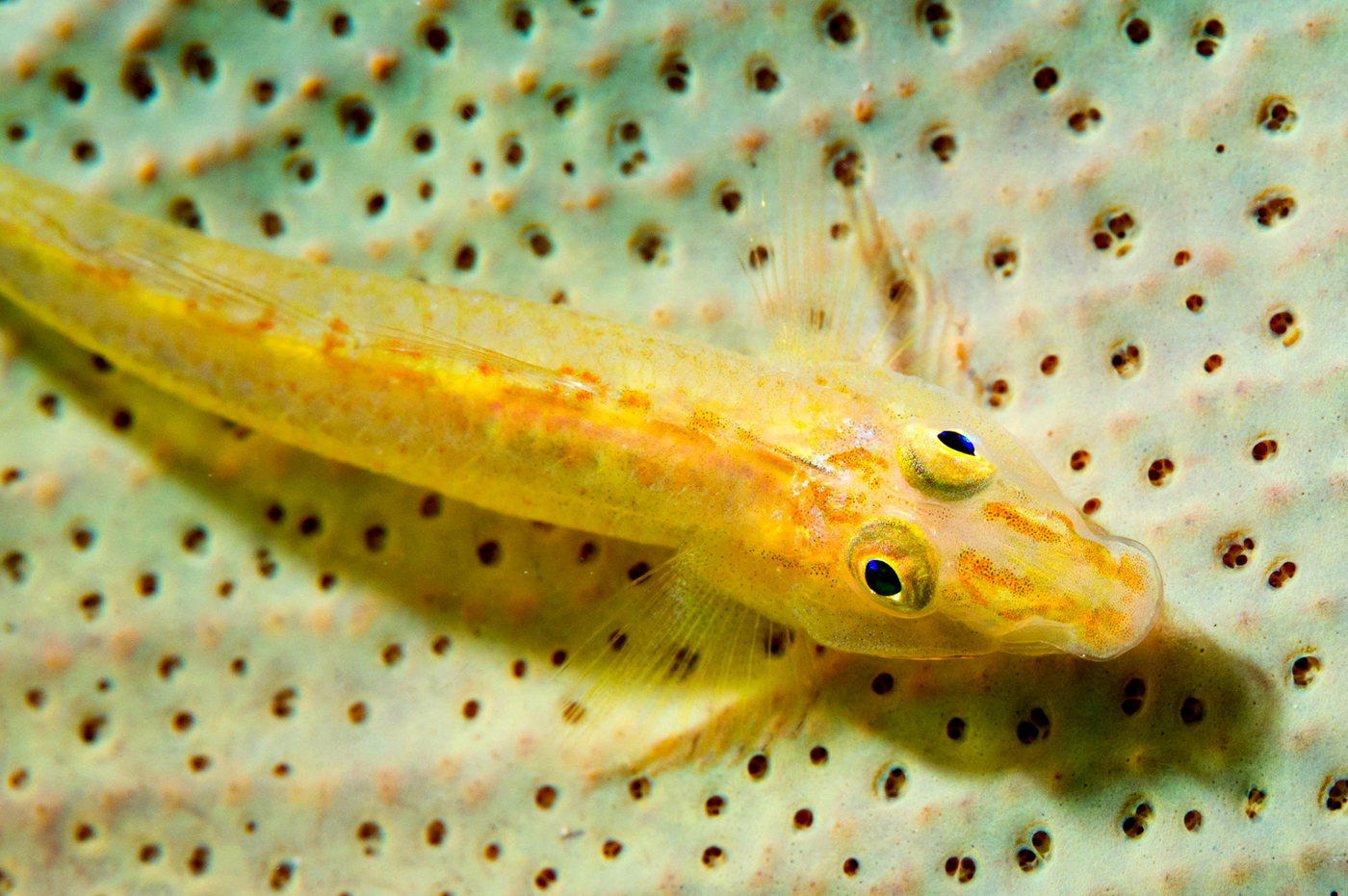
- Romblon, Philippines, June 2016

Conservation status
- Least Concern (IUCN 3.1)

Scientific classification
- Kingdom: Animalia
- Phylum: Chordata
- Class: Actinopterygii
- Order: Gobiiformes
- Family: Gobiidae
- Genus: Luposicya
- Species: L. lupus

Binomial name
- Luposicya lupus J. L. B. Smith, 1959

= Wolfsnout goby =

Species of fish

The wolfsnout goby (Luposicya lupus), also known as the dognsout goby or cup-sponge goby, is a species of goby native to the Indian Ocean and the western Pacific Ocean. This species lives on large fan-shaped or floppy sponges, particularly Phyllospongia foliascens and Phyllospongia papyracea, growing on reefs at depths down to 15 metres (49 ft). This species grows to a length of 3.5 centimetres (1.4 in) SL. This species is the only known member of its genus. It spans benthically and is a solitary species.
