= Geranylfarnesol =

Names
- IUPAC name (2E,6E,10E,14E)-3,7,11,15,19-pentamethylicosa-2,6,10,14,18-pentaen-1-ol
- Other names: (E)-geranyl farnesol; (E)-neryl farnesol

Identifiers
CAS Number	79577-58-5
3D model (JSmol)	Interactive image
ChEBI	CHEBI:167138
ChemSpider	4943930
PubChem CID	6439529
- InChI: InChI=1S/C25H42O/c1-21(2)11-7-12-22(3)13-8-14-23(4)15-9-16-24(5)17-10-18-25(6)19-20-26/h11,13,15,17,19,26H,7-10,12,14,16,18,20H2,1-6H3/b22-13+,23-15+,24-17+,25-19+ Key: YHTCXUSSQJMLQD-GIXZANJISA-N
- SMILES: CC(=CCC/C(=C/CC/C(=C/CC/C(=C/CC/C(=C/CO)/C)/C)/C)/C)C

Properties
Chemical formula	C_{25}H_{42}O
Molar mass	358.610 g·mol^{−1}
Appearance	colorless oil
Density	0.9±0.1 g/cm^{3}
Melting point	°C
Boiling point	464 to 466 °C
Solubility in water	insoluble

Hazards
Flash point	278 °F
- Except where otherwise noted, data are given for materials in their standard state (at 25 °C [77 °F], 100 kPa). Infobox references

Geranylfarnesol is a naturally occurring irregular, long-chain, acyclic isoprenoid alcohol. This is a C_{25} compound, positioned between the ubiquitous C_{15} farnesol and the C_{30} triterpenoid squalene in the isoprenoid biosynthesis pathway. Its chemical formula is C_{25}H_{42}O. Geranylfarnesol has garnered scientific interest primarily due to its role as a key biosynthetic intermediate and its potent biological activity as an inducer of apoptosis (programmed cell death).

== Structure ==
The compound is a member of sesterterpenoid group. The chemical structure consists of a linear chain of five isoprene units (C_{5}H_{8}) in a head-to-tail arrangement, terminated by a hydroxyl (—OH) group. It is the C_{25} homolog of the more common C_{15} isoprenoid farnesol and the direct precursor to the C_{30} isoprenoid squalene. The "geranyl" prefix indicates its structural relationship to geraniol (C_{10}) and farnesol (C_{15}).

== Natural occurrence ==
The compound was isolated from the wax of the insect Ceroplastes albolineatus via hydrolysis. Geranylfarnesol was also isolated from sponge Fasciospongia fovea and identified in the frontal glands of the termites Reticulitermes santonensis.

== Physical properties ==
Geranylfarnesol forms a colorless, viscous oil and is insoluble in water.

== Uses ==
Geranylfarnesol is known as an inducer of apoptosis in mammalian cells, often exhibiting greater potency than its shorter-chain relative, farnesol. It appears to trigger the mitochondrial (intrinsic) pathway of apoptosis.

== See also ==
- Farnesylation
- Farnesene
- Farnesyl pyrophosphate
- Geranylgeraniol
- Nerolidol
