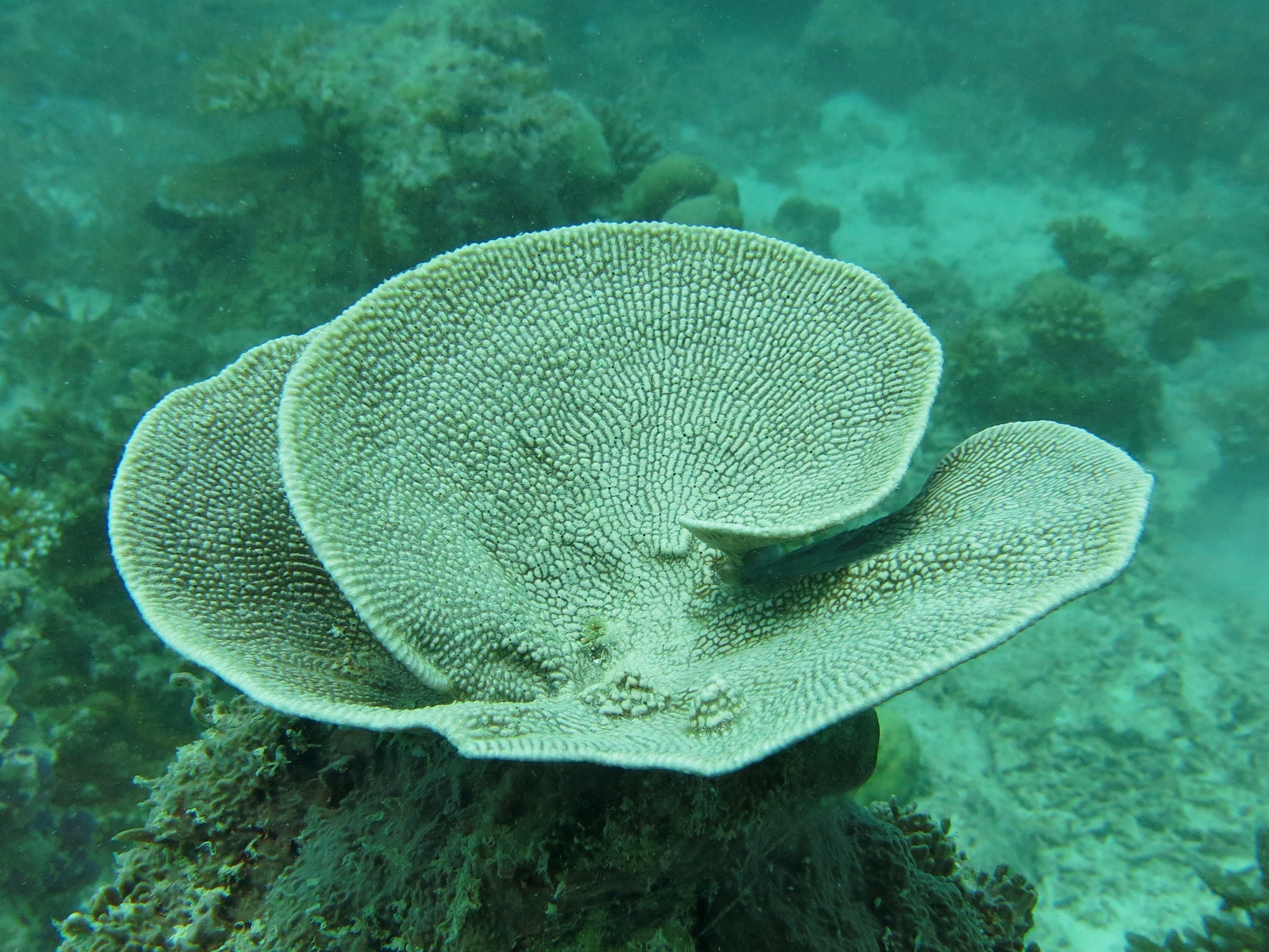
- Carteriospongia cf. foliascens at Baa Atoll in the Maldives

Scientific classification
- Kingdom: Animalia
- Phylum: Porifera
- Class: Demospongiae
- Order: Dictyoceratida
- Family: Thorectidae
- Subfamily: Phyllospongiinae
- Genus: Carteriospongia; Hyatt, 1877

Species
- See text

Synonyms
- List: Carterispongia [lapsus]; Carterospongia [lapsus]; Hircinia (Polyfibrospongia) Bowerbank, 1877; Phyllospongia (Carteriospongia) Hyatt, 1877; Polyfibrospongia Bowerbank, 1877

= Carteriospongia =

Genus of sponges

Carteriospongia is a genus of sea sponges in the family Thorectidae.

There is some debate around the taxonomy of the group, with a 2021 molecular and morphological assessment of the subfamily Phyllospongiinae suggesting that Carteriospongia should become a synonym of Phyllospongia, and reinstating Carteriospongia flabellifera to its original designation of Polyfibrospongia flabellifera. The same study described 2 new species, designated Phyllospongia bergquistae sp. nov. and Polyfibrospongia kulit sp. nov..

== Species ==
- Carteriospongia contorta Bergquist, Ayling & Wilkinson, 1988
- Carteriospongia delicata Pulitzer-Finali, 1982
- Carteriospongia fissurella (de Laubenfels, 1948)
- Carteriospongia foliascens (Pallas, 1766)
- Carteriospongia mystica Hyatt, 1877
- Carteriospongia pennatula (Lamarck, 1813)
- Carteriospongia perforata Hyatt, 1877
- Carteriospongia silicata (Lendenfeld, 1889)
- Carteriospongia vermicularis (Lendenfeld, 1889)
