= Smenospongia =

Scientific classification
- Domain: Eukaryota
- Kingdom: Animalia
- Phylum: Porifera
- Class: Demospongiae
- Order: Dictyoceratida
- Family: Thorectidae
- Subfamily: Thorectinae
- Genus: Smenospongia; Wiedenmayer, 1977

Type species
- Aplysina aurea Hyatt, 1875

Genus of sponges

Smenospongia is a genus of demosponges in the family Thorectidae.

Twelve new species of Korean Smenospongia were described in 2016. As of November 2018, the World Porifera database accepted the following species of Smenospongia:

- Smenospongia arbuscula Sim, Lee & Kim, 2016
- Smenospongia aurea (Hyatt, 1875)
- Smenospongia cerebriformis (Duchassaing & Michelotti, 1864)
- Smenospongia conulosa Pulitzer-Finali, 1986
- Smenospongia dokdoensis Sim, Lee & Kim, 2016
- Smenospongia duokyeo Sim, Lee & Kim, 2016
- Smenospongia dysodes (de Laubenfels, 1954)
- Smenospongia echina (Laubenfels, 1934)
- Smenospongia flavia Sim, Lee & Kim, 2016
- Smenospongia gageoensis Sim, Lee & Kim, 2016
- Smenospongia musicalis (Duchassaing & Michelotti, 1864)
- Smenospongia nigra Sim, Lee & Kim, 2016
- Smenospongia nuda (Lévi, 1969)
- Smenospongia ramosa Sandes & Pinheiro, 2014
- Smenospongia scalaris Sim, Lee & Kim, 2016
- Smenospongia spinulosa Sim, Lee & Kim, 2016
- Smenospongia varispina Sim, Lee & Kim, 2016
- Smenospongia wiedenmayeri Sim, Lee & Kim, 2016
