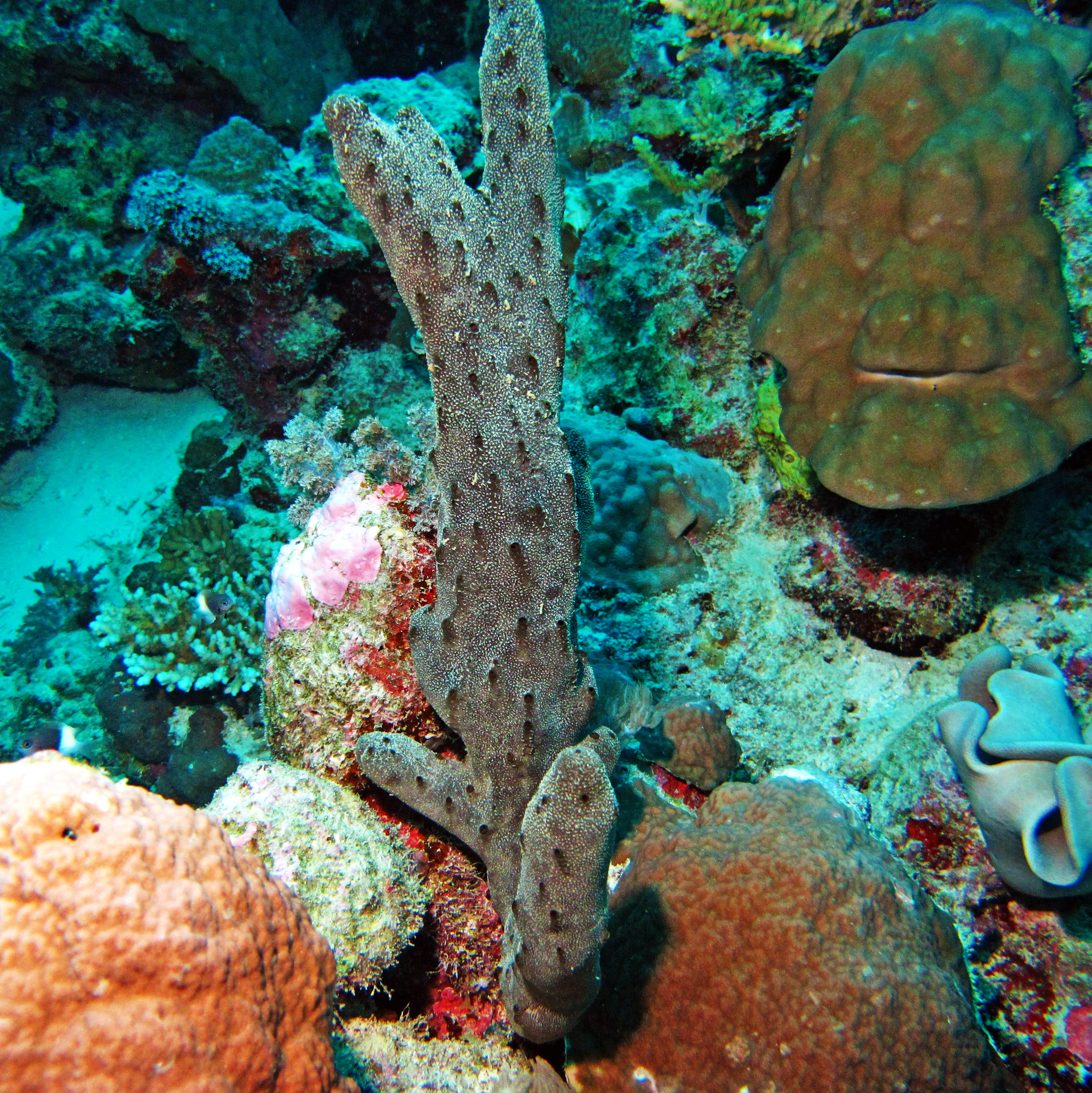
- Hyrtios erectus. Sudan, Red Sea

Scientific classification
- Kingdom: Animalia
- Phylum: Porifera
- Class: Demospongiae
- Order: Dictyoceratida
- Family: Thorectidae
- Genus: Hyrtios; Duchassaing de Fonbressin & Michelotti, 1864

= Hyrtios =

Genus of sponges

Hyrtios is a genus of sponges belonging to the family Thorectidae.

== Species ==
Species within this genus include:

- Hyrtios altus (Poléjaeff, 1884)
- Hyrtios arenosus (Thiele, 1905)
- Hyrtios caracasensis (Carter, 1882)
- Hyrtios cavernosus (Vacelet, Vasseur & Lévi, 1976)
- Hyrtios collectrix (Schulze, 1880)
- Hyrtios communis (Carter, 1885)
- Hyrtios digitatus (Lendenfeld, 1888)
- Hyrtios elegans (Lendenfeld, 1888)
- Hyrtios erectus (Keller, 1889)
- Hyrtios proteus Duchassaing & Michelotti, 1864
- Hyrtios pulcher (Carter, 1885)
- Hyrtios reticulatus (Thiele, 1899)
- Hyrtios sororia (Thiele, 1905)
- Hyrtios spinifer (Poléjaeff, 1884)
- Hyrtios vinciguerrae (Sarà, 1978)
- Hyrtios violaceus (Duchassaing & Michelotti, 1864)
