= Farnesene =

(E,E)-α-Farnesene
- Skeletal formula of (E,E)-α-farnesene

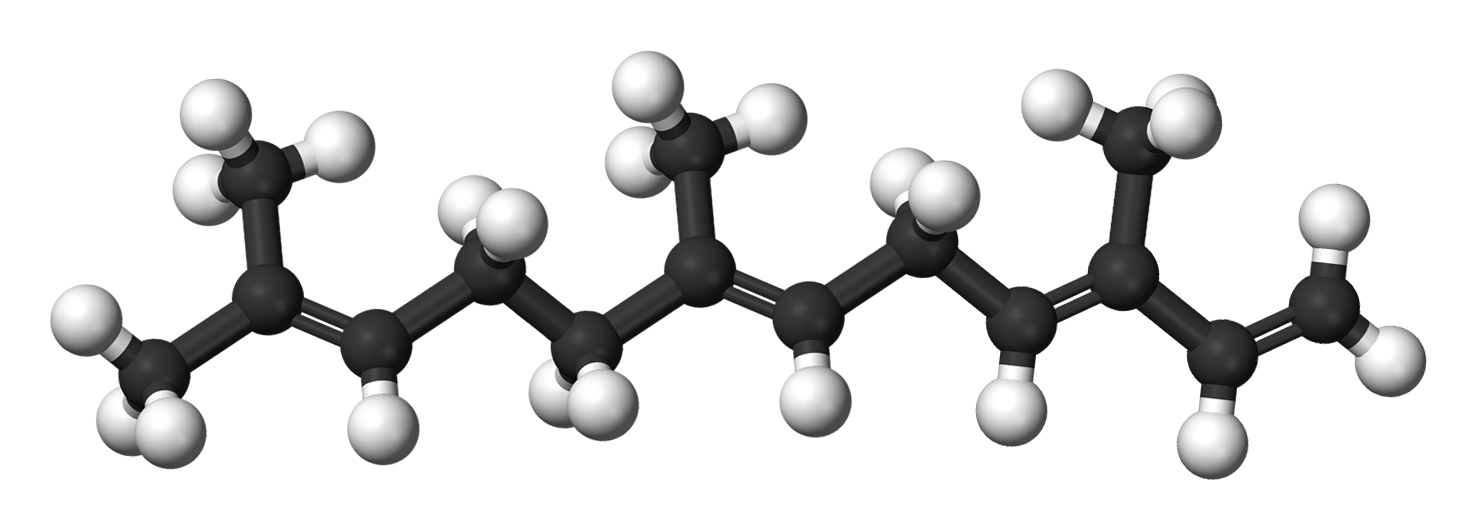
- Ball-and-stick model of (E,E)-α-farnesene

Names
- IUPAC name α: 3,7,11-trimethyl-1,3,6,10-dodecatetraene

Identifiers
CAS Number	502-61-4 (E,E)-α-Farnesene; 28973-99-1 alpha,(Z,Z)
3D model (JSmol)	Interactive image
Beilstein Reference	1840984, 1840982, 1840983, 2204279
ChEBI	CHEBI:39240 alpha,(E,Z); CHEBI:10280 alpha,(E,E); CHEBI:39238 alpha,(Z,E); CHEBI:39239 alpha,(Z,Z); CHEBI:39242 beta,Z; CHEBI:10418 beta,E
ChEMBL	ChEMBL3182226
ChemSpider	4444849
KEGG	C09665 alpha,(E,E)
PubChem CID	5281516 alpha,(E,E); 5362889 alpha,(Z,E); 5317320 alpha,(Z,Z); 5317319 beta,Z; 5281517 beta,E
UNII	7E1785CZ0H (E,E)-α-Farnesene; L664C3SC2M alpha,(Z,Z)
- InChI: InChI=1S/C15H24/c1-6-14(4)10-8-12-15(5)11-7-9-13(2)3/h6,9-10,12H,1,7-8,11H2,2-5H3/b14-10+,15-12+ Key: CXENHBSYCFFKJS-VDQVFBMKSA-N; InChI=1/C15H24/c1-6-14(4)10-8-12-15(5)11-7-9-13(2)3/h6,9-10,12H,1,7-8,11H2,2-5H3/b14-10+,15-12+ Key: CXENHBSYCFFKJS-VDQVFBMKBY
- SMILES: C(=C/C/C=C(/CC/C=C(\C)C)C)(\C=C)C

Properties
Chemical formula	C_{15}H_{24}
Molar mass	204.36 g/mol
Density	0.813 g/mL
Boiling point	α-(Z): 125 at 12 mmHg (1.6 kPa) β-(E): 124 °C β-(Z): 95-107 at 3 mmHg (0.40 kPa)
- Except where otherwise noted, data are given for materials in their standard state (at 25 °C [77 °F], 100 kPa). verify (what is ?) Infobox references

The term farnesene refers to a set of six closely related chemical compounds which all are sesquiterpenes. α-Farnesene and β-farnesene are isomers, differing by the location of one double bond. α-Farnesene is 3,7,11-trimethyl-1,3,6,10-dodecatetraene and β-farnesene is 7,11-dimethyl-3-methylene-1,6,10-dodecatriene. The alpha form can exist as four stereoisomers that differ about the geometry of two of its three internal double bonds (the stereoisomers of the third internal double bond are identical). The beta isomer exists as two stereoisomers about the geometry of its central double bond.

All four of the α-farnesene stereoisomers are reported to occur in nature with (E,E)-α-Farnesene the most common isomer. It is found in the coating of apples, and other fruits, and it is responsible for the characteristic green apple odour and more extensively described as "citrus, herbal, lavender, bergamot, myrrh, neroli, green, woody, vegetable, floral". Its oxidation by air forms compounds that are damaging to the fruit. The oxidation products injure cell membranes which eventually causes cell death in the outermost cell layers of the fruit, resulting in a storage disorder known as scald. α-Farnesene is also the chief compound contributing to the scent of gardenia, making up ~65% of the headspace constituents.

Another stereoisomer, (Z,E)-α-Farnesene (CAS 26560-14-5), has been isolated from the oil of perilla. Both the (E,E) and (Z,E)-α-Farnesene isomers are known insect semiochemicals; they act as alarm pheromones in termites or food attractants for the apple tree pest, the codling moth. The (E,Z)-α-Farnesene isomer (CAS 28973-98-0) is also found in plants sources.

β-Farnesene has one naturally occurring isomer. The E isomer is a constituent of various essential oils. It is also released by aphids as an alarm pheromone upon death to warn away other aphids. Several plants, including potato species, have been shown to synthesize this pheromone as a natural insect repellent. Recently renewable aviation fuel (synthetic iso-paraffin) has been produced through c6 sugars being converted to Farnesene, which is then hydrotreated. Making it a highly promising biofuel precursor.

== See also ==
- Farnesol
- Geranylfarnesol
- Nerolidol
- Prenylation
- Terpene
