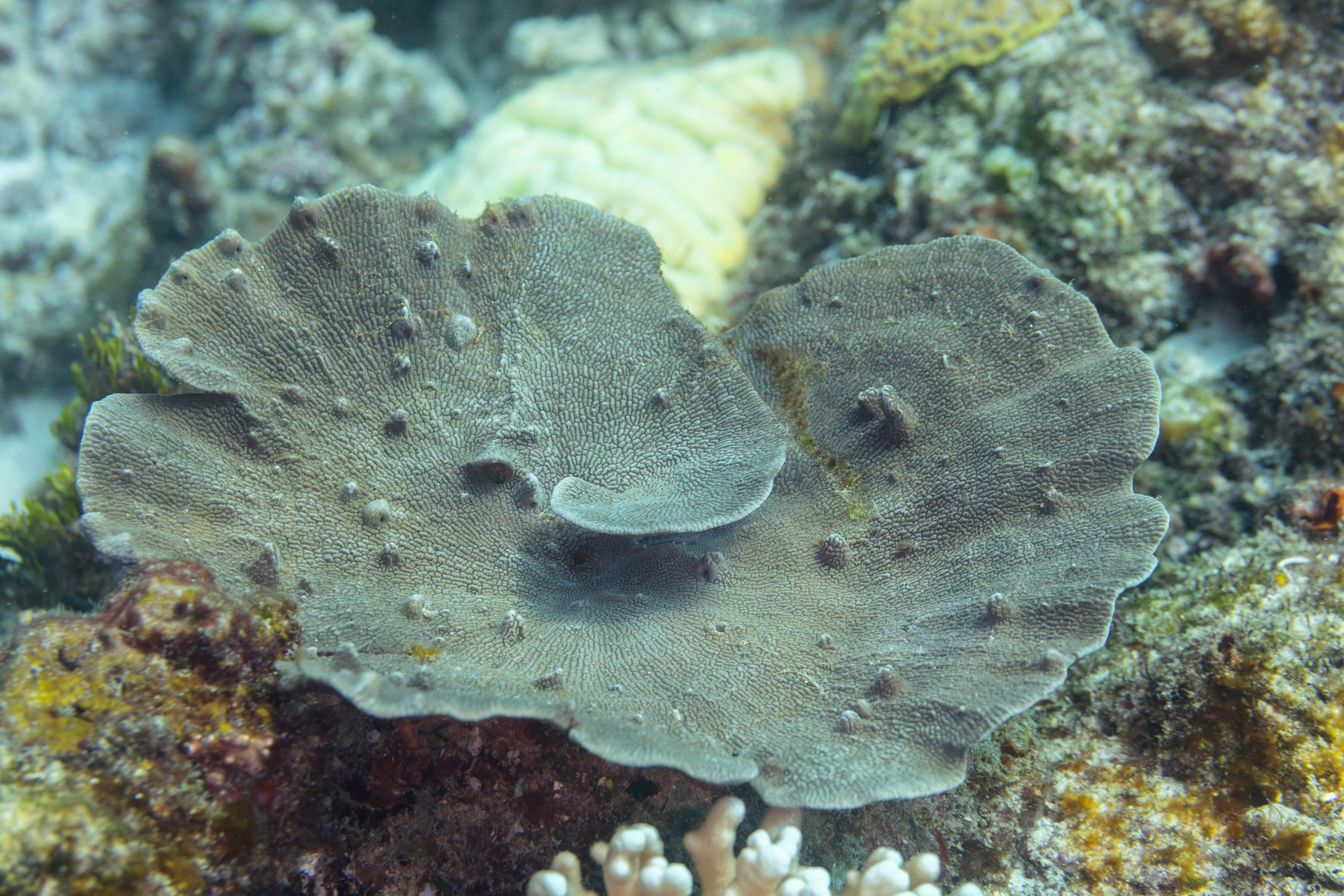

Scientific classification
- Kingdom: Animalia
- Phylum: Porifera
- Class: Demospongiae
- Order: Dictyoceratida
- Family: Thorectidae
- Genus: Carteriospongia
- Species: C. foliascens

Binomial name
- Carteriospongia foliascens (Pallas, 1766)

Synonyms
- List: Cacospongia poculum Selenka, 1867; Carteriospongia elegans (Lendenfeld, 1888); Carteriospongia fissurata (Lamarck, 1814); Carteriospongia otahitica (Esper, 1794); Carteriospongia vermifera Hyatt, 1877; Carterispongia foliascens (Pallas, 1766) [lapsus]; Carterispongia mantelli (Bowerbank, 1874); Carterispongia otahitica (Esper, 1794); Halispongia mantelli Bowerbank, 1874; Halispongia ventriculoides Bowerbank, 1874; Hircinia (Polyfibrospongia) flabellifera (Bowerbank, 1877); Phyllospongia (Carteriospongia) elegans Lendenfeld, 1888; Phyllospongia (Carteriospongia) foliascens (Pallas, 1766); Phyllospongia (Carteriospongia) mantelli (Bowerbank, 1874); Phyllospongia (Carteriospongia) spiralis Lendenfeld, 1889; Phyllospongia elegans Lendenfeld, 1888; Phyllospongia foliacens (Pallas, 1766) [lapsus]; Phyllospongia foliascens (Pallas, 1766); Phyllospongia lekanis de Laubenfels, 1954; Phyllospongia mantelli (Bowerbank, 1874); Phyllospongia spiralis Lendenfeld, 1889; Spongia fissurata Lamarck, 1814; Spongia foliascens Pallas, 1766; Spongia otahitica Esper, 1794; Spongia othaitica Lamarck, 1814; Spongia penicillata Esper, 1794

= Carteriospongia foliascens =

Species of sponge

Carteriospongia foliascens is a species of sea sponge in the family Thorectidae. Carteriospongia foliascens hosts an exceptionally diverse variety of microbial life, mainly Candidatus Synechococcus.
