= Darlifarnib =

Investigational drug

Clinical data
- Other names: KO-2806

Identifiers
- IUPAC name: (3S)-3-Amino-3-(1-methyl-1H-imidazol-5-yl)-6-oxa-2(4,6)-quinolina-1,4(1,3)-dibenzenacyclohexaphane-2^{2},4^{4}-dicarbonitrile
- CAS Number: 3065226-39-0
- PubChem CID: 169292214
- UNII: 9PE5MSX2YS
- KEGG: D13346

Chemical and physical data
- Formula: C_{29}H_{20}N_{6}O
- Molar mass: 468.520 g·mol^{−1}
- 3D model (JSmol): Interactive image
- SMILES: CN1C=NC=C1[C@@]2(C3=CC(=C(C=C3)C#N)COC4=CC=CC(=C4)C5=C6C=C2C=CC6=NC(=C5)C#N)N
- InChI: InChI=InChI=1S/C29H20N6O/c1-35-17-33-15-28(35)29(32)21-6-5-19(13-30)20(9-21)16-36-24-4-2-3-18(10-24)25-12-23(14-31)34-27-8-7-22(29)11-26(25)27/h2-12,15,17H,16,32H2,1H3/t29-/m0/s1; Key:GWKGWWBQKOIPNP-LJAQVGFWSA-N

Darlifarnib is an investigational new drug that is being developed by Kura Oncology, Inc. for the treatment of solid tumors. It is a farnesyltranstransferase inhibitor.
