= Hypselodoris bertschi =

Scientific classification
- Kingdom: Animalia
- Phylum: Mollusca
- Class: Gastropoda
- Order: Nudibranchia
- Family: Chromodorididae
- Genus: Hypselodoris
- Species: H. bertschi

Binomial name
- Hypselodoris bertschi Gosliner & Johnson, 1999

Species of gastropod

Hypselodoris bertschi is a species of sea slug or dorid nudibranch, a marine gastropod mollusk in the family Chromodorididae.

== Distribution ==
This nudibranch is known only from Hawaii in the central Pacific Ocean.

== Description ==
Hypselodoris bertschi has a translucent white body with longitudinal opaque white lines flecked with black-purple spots. The gills and rhinophores are translucent white, lined with orange tips and base. There has been some confusion in the naming of this species, and it is easily confused with Hypselodoris peasei. This species can reach a total length of at least 25 mm.
