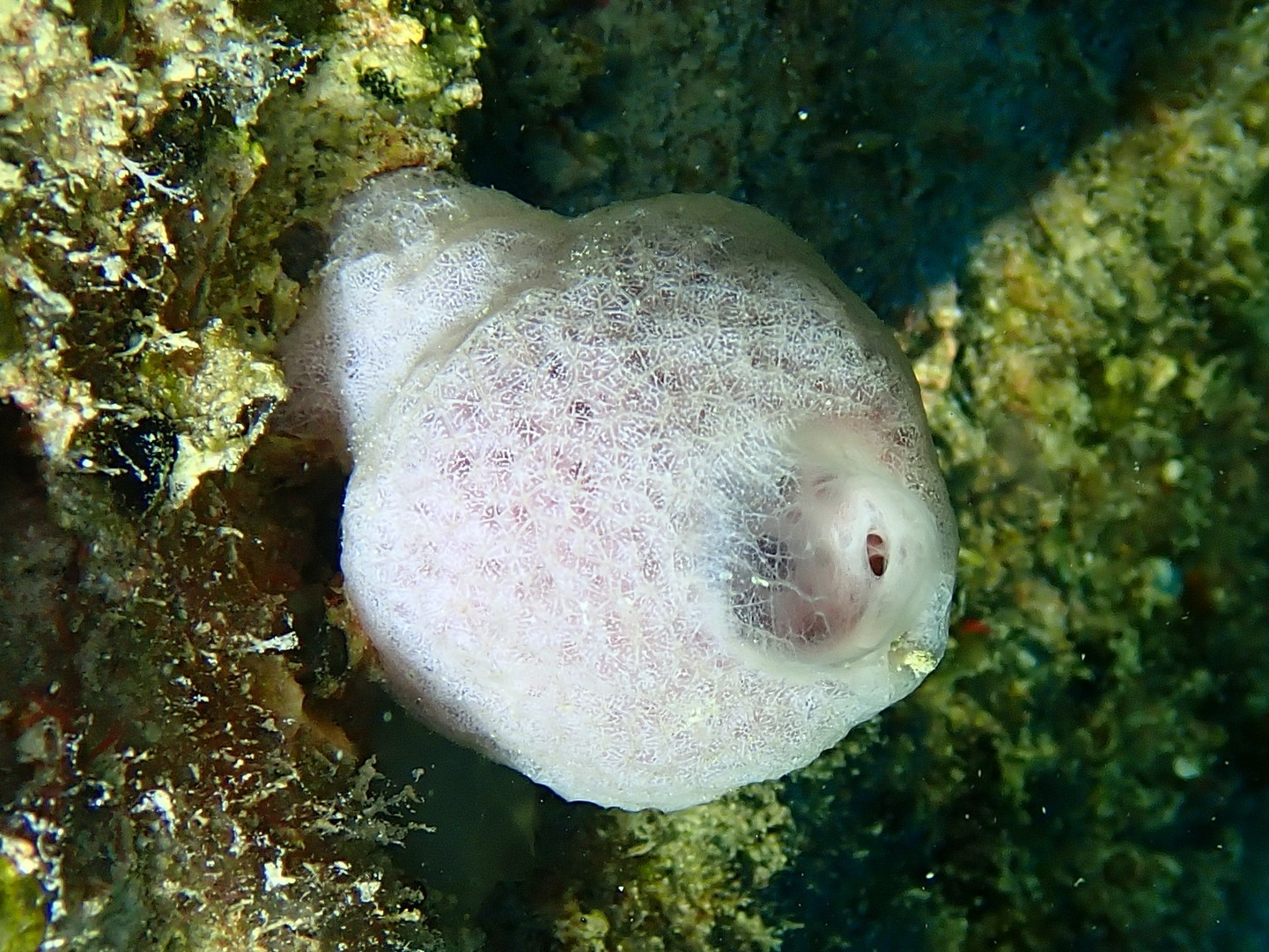
- Luffariella geometrica

Scientific classification
- Kingdom: Animalia
- Phylum: Porifera
- Class: Demospongiae
- Order: Dictyoceratida
- Family: Thorectidae
- Subfamily: Thorectinae
- Genus: Luffariella; Thiele, 1899

Species
- see text

= Luffariella =

Genus of sponges

Luffariella is a genus of sea sponges in the family Thorectidae. Its first valid description was given in 1899 by Johannes Thiele.

One of its species is one of the few organisms that synthesizes derivatives of cyclopentanepentol.

== Species ==
The following species are recognised in the genus Luffariella:

- Luffariella caliculata Bergquist, 1995
- Luffariella cylindrica Bergquist, 1995
- Luffariella geometrica Kirkpatrick, 1900
- Luffariella herdmani (Dendy, 1905)
- Luffariella koreana Sim, Lee & Kim, 2017
- Luffariella tubula Sim, Lee & Kim, 2017
- Luffariella variabilis (Polejaeff, 1884)
