= Humulene =

Naturally occurring monocyclic sesquiterpene

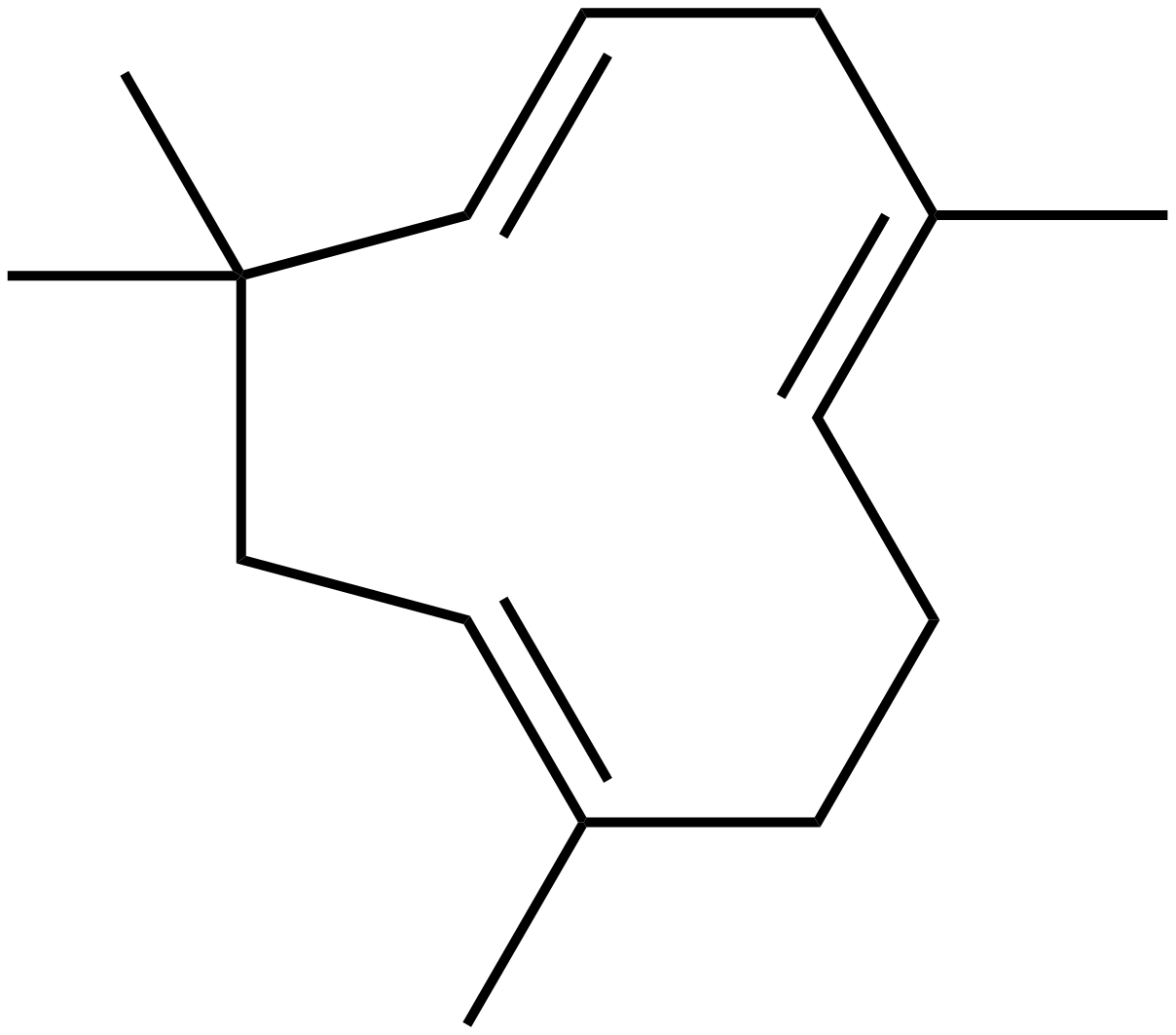
- Humulene

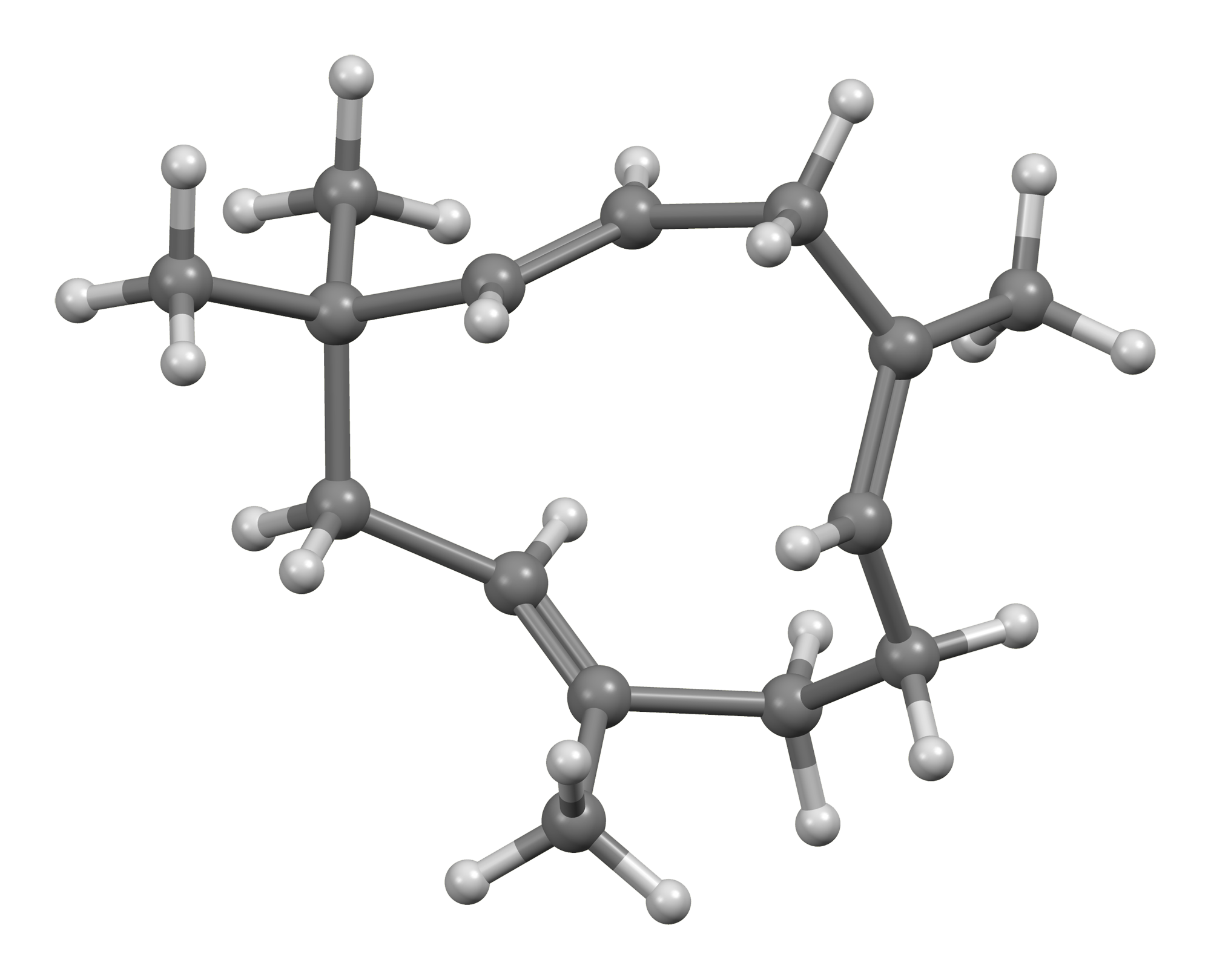

Names
- IUPAC name [1(11)E,4E,8E]-Humula-1(11),4,8-triene
- Systematic IUPAC name (1E,4E,8E)-2,6,6,9-Tetramethylcycloundeca-1,4-8-triene
- Other names α-Caryophyllene; 3,7,10-Humulatriene

Identifiers
| CAS Number | 6753-98-6 |
| 3D model (JSmol) | Interactive image |
| ChEBI | CHEBI:5768 |
| ChEMBL | ChEMBL251280 |
| ChemSpider | 4444853 |
| ECHA InfoCard | 100.027.106 |
| PubChem CID | 5281520 |
| UNII | 54W56MD2WD |
| CompTox Dashboard (EPA) | DTXSID30858793 |
- InChI: InChI=1S/C15H24/c1-13-7-5-8-14(2)10-12-15(3,4)11-6-9-13/h6-7,10-11H,5,8-9,12H2,1-4H3/b11-6+,13-7+,14-10+ Key: FAMPSKZZVDUYOS-HRGUGZIWSA-N; InChI=1/C15H24/c1-13-7-5-8-14(2)10-12-15(3,4)11-6-9-13/h6-7,10-11H,5,8-9,12H2,1-4H3/b11-6+,13-7+,14-10+ Key: FAMPSKZZVDUYOS-HRGUGZIWBF
- SMILES: C\1=C/C(C)(C)C/C=C(/CC/C=C(/C/1)C)C

Properties
| Chemical formula | C_{15}H_{24} |
| Molar mass | 204.357 g·mol^{−1} |
| Appearance | Pale yellowish green clear liquid |
| Density | 0.886 g/cm^{3} |
| Melting point | < 25 °C (77 °F; 298 K) |
| Boiling point | 106 to 107 °C (223 to 225 °F; 379 to 380 K) at 5 mmHg |

Hazards
- Lethal dose or concentration (LD, LC)
| LD_{50} (median dose) | >48 mg/kg |
| Safety data sheet (SDS) | MSDS |
- Except where otherwise noted, data are given for materials in their standard state (at 25 °C [77 °F], 100 kPa). verify (what is ?) Infobox references

Humulene, also known as α-humulene or α-caryophyllene, is a naturally occurring monocyclic sesquiterpene (C_{15}H_{24}), containing an 11-membered ring and consisting of 3 isoprene units containing three nonconjugated C=C double bonds, two of them being triply substituted and one being doubly substituted. It was first found in the essential oils of Humulus lupulus (hops), from which it derives its name. Humulene is an isomer of β-caryophyllene, and the two are often found together as a mixture in many aromatic plants.

== Occurrence ==
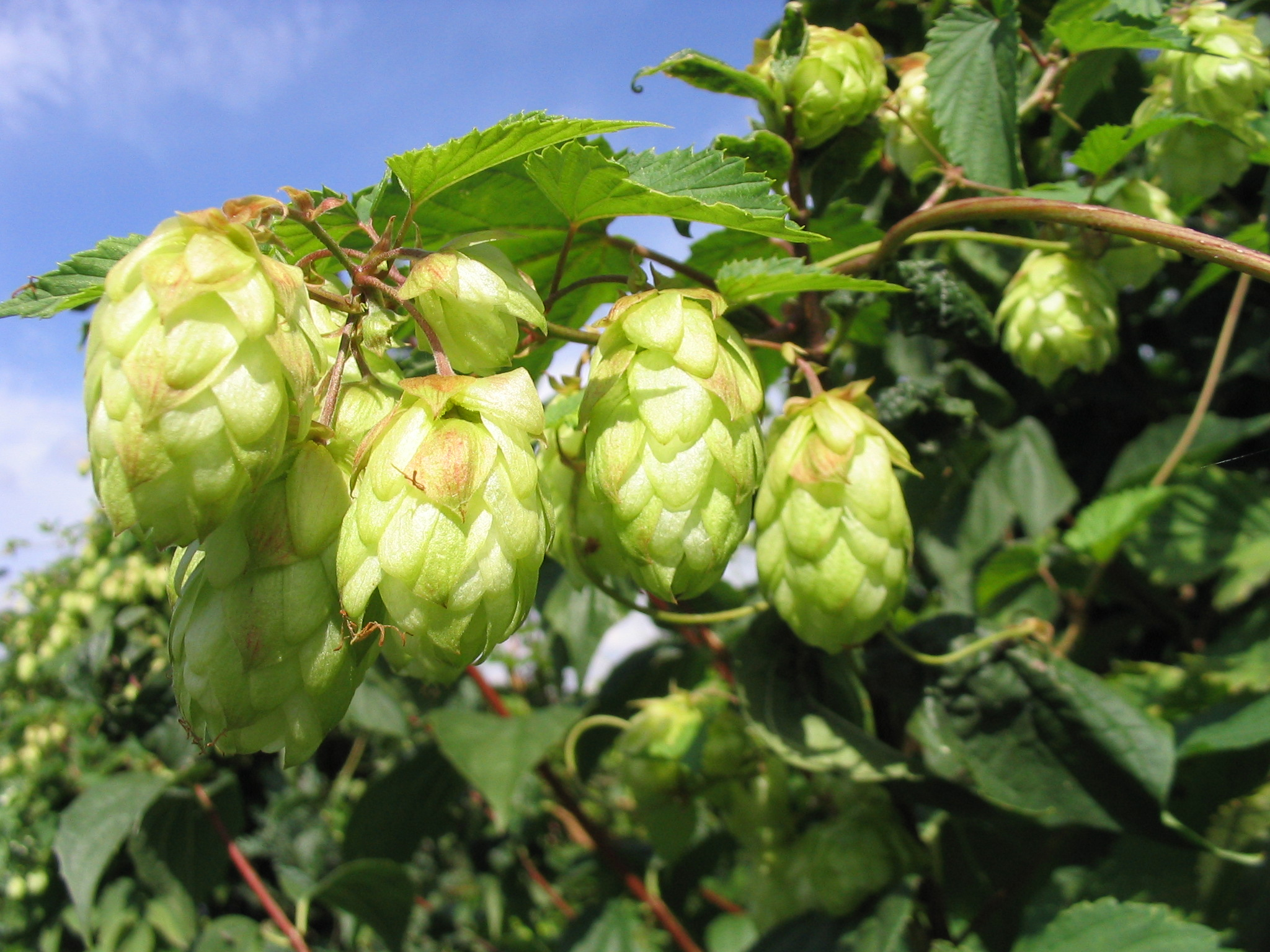
Humulus lupulus

Humulene is one of the components of the essential oil from the flowering cone of the hops plant, Humulus lupulus, from which it derives its name. The concentration of humulene varies among different varieties of the plant but can be up to 40% of the essential oil. Humulene and its reaction products in the brewing process of beer gives many beers their "hoppy" aroma. Noble hop varieties have been found to have higher levels of humulene, while other bitter hop varieties contain low levels. Multiple epoxides of humulene are produced in the brewing process. In a scientific study involving gas chromatography–mass spectrometry analysis of samples and a trained sensory panel, it was found that the hydrolysis products of humulene epoxide II specifically produces a "hoppy" aroma in beer. α-Humulene has been found in many aromatic plants on all continents, often together with its isomer β-caryophyllene. Proven α-humulene emitters into the atmosphere are pine trees, orange orchards, marsh elders, tobacco, and sunflower fields. α-Humulene is contained in the essential oils of aromatic plants such as Salvia officinalis (common sage, culinary sage), Lindera aggregata Uyaku or Japanese spicebush, ginseng species, up to 29.9% of the essential oils of Mentha spicata, the ginger family (Zingiberaceae), 10% of the leaf oil of Litsea mushaensis, a Chinese laurel tree, 4% of the leaf extract of Cordia verbenacea, a bush in coastal tropical South America (erva baleeira), but with 25% trans-caryophyllene and is one of the chemical compounds that contribute to the taste of the spice Persicaria odorata or Vietnamese coriander and the characteristic aroma of Cannabis.

== Preparation and synthesis ==
Humulene is one of many sesquiterpenoids that are derived from farnesyl diphosphate (FPP). The formation of humulene from FPP is catalyzed by sesquiterpene synthesis enzymes.

This biosynthesis can be mimicked in the laboratory by preparing allylic stannane from farnesol, termed Corey synthesis. There are diverse ways to synthesize humulene in the laboratory, involving differing closures of the C-C bond in the macrocycle. The McMurry synthesis uses a titanium-catalyzed carbonyl coupling reaction; the Takahashi synthesis uses intramolecular alkylation of an allyl halide by a protected cyanohydrin anion; the Suginome synthesis utilizes a geranyl fragment; and the de Groot synthesis synthesizes humulene from a crude distillate of eucalyptus oil. Humulene can also be synthesized using a combination of four-component assembly and palladium-mediated cyclization, outlined below. This synthesis is noteworthy for the simplicity of the C−C bond constructions and cyclization steps, which it is believed will prove advantageous in the synthesis of related polyterpenoids.

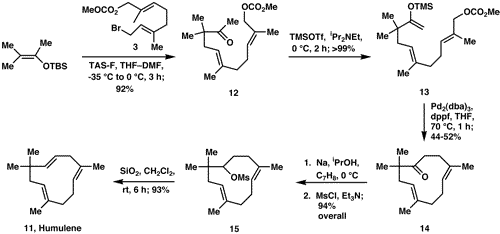

To understand humulene's regioselectivity, the fact that one of the two triply substituted C═C double bonds is significantly more reactive, its conformational space was explored computationally and four different conformations were identified.

== Research ==
In laboratory studies, humulene is being studied for potential anti-inflammatory effects.

In 2015 researchers in Brazil identified α-humulene as an active contributor to the insect repellent properties of Commiphora leptophloeos leaf oil, specifically against the yellow fever mosquito, Aedes aegypti.

== Atmospheric chemistry ==
α-Humulene is a biogenic volatile organic compound, emitted by numerous plants (see occurrence) with a relatively high potential for secondary organic aerosol formation in the atmosphere. It quickly reacts with ozone in sunlight (photooxidation) to form oxygenated products. α-Humulene has a very high reaction rate coefficient (1.17×10^{−14} cm^{3} molecule^{−1} s^{−1}) compared to most monoterpenes. Since it contains three double bonds, first-, second- and third-generation products are possible that can each condense to form secondary organic aerosol. At typical tropospheric ozone mixing ratios of 30 ppb the lifetime of α-humulene is about 2 minutes, while the first- and second-generation products have average lifetimes of 1 hour and 12.5 hours, respectively.
