= Nerolidol =

trans-Nerolidol (top) and cis-Nerolidol (bottom)
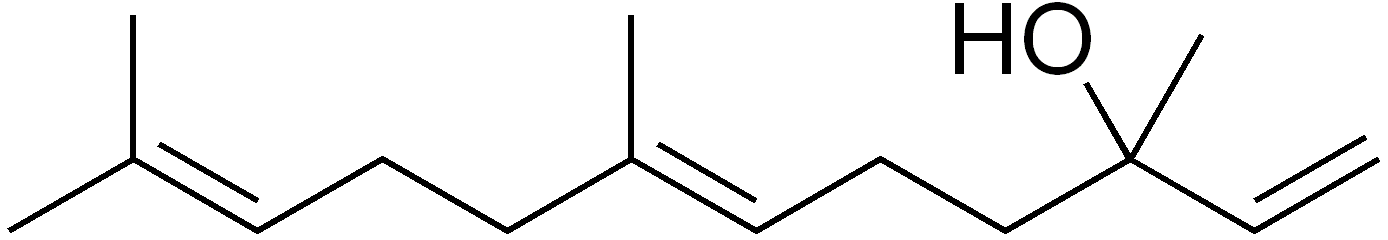
- trans-Nerolidol

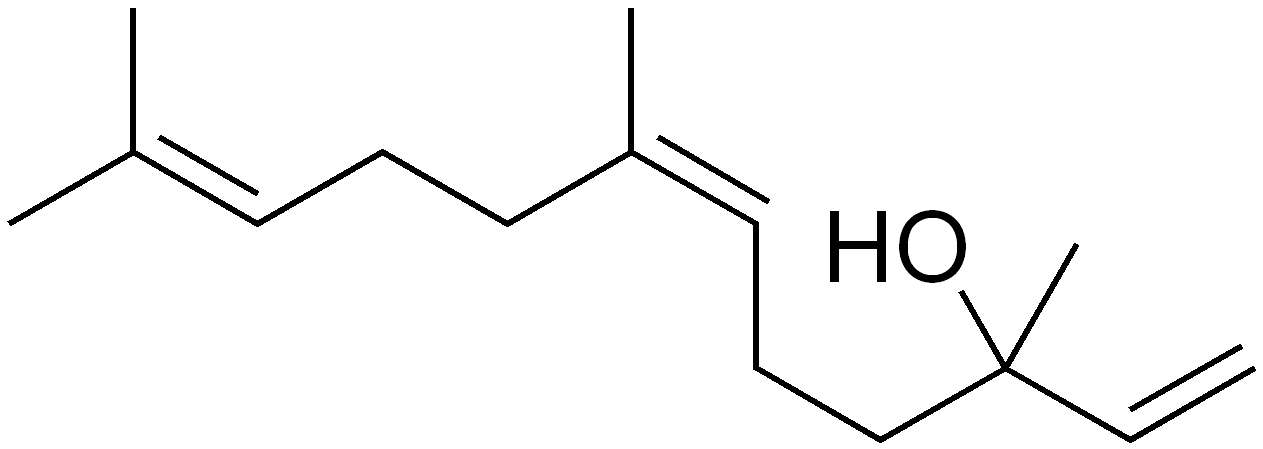
- cis-Nerolidol

Names
- IUPAC name 3,7,11-Trimethyl-1,6,10-dodecatrien-3-ol
- Other names Peruviol

Identifiers
CAS Number	7212-44-4 (unspecified); 3790-78-1 (6-Z); 40716-66-3 (6-E)
3D model (JSmol)	(unspecified): Interactive image; (cis): Interactive image; (trans): Interactive image
ChEBI	CHEBI:7524 (unspecified); CHEBI:173119 (cis); CHEBI:141283 (trans)
ChemSpider	8549 (unspecified); 4478283 (cis); 4447568 (trans)
ECHA InfoCard	100.027.816
PubChem CID	8888 (unspecified); 5320128 (cis); 5284507 (trans)
UNII	QR6IP857S6 (unspecified); 81K23DEF7B (cis); FG5V0N8P2H (trans)
CompTox Dashboard (EPA)	DTXSID3022247
- InChI: (unspecified): InChI=1S/C15H26O/c1-6-15(5,16)12-8-11-14(4)10-7-9-13(2)3/h6,9,11,16H,1,7-8,10,12H2,2-5H3 Key: FQTLCLSUCSAZDY-UHFFFAOYSA-N; (cis): InChI=1S/C15H26O/c1-6-15(5,16)12-8-11-14(4)10-7-9-13(2)3/h6,9,11,16H,1,7-8,10,12H2,2-5H3/b14-11- Key: FQTLCLSUCSAZDY-KAMYIIQDSA-N; (trans): InChI=1S/C15H26O/c1-6-15(5,16)12-8-11-14(4)10-7-9-13(2)3/h6,9,11,16H,1,7-8,10,12H2,2-5H3/b14-11+ Key: FQTLCLSUCSAZDY-SDNWHVSQSA-N
- SMILES: (unspecified): OC(\C=C)(CCC=C(CC/C=C(\C)C)C)C; (cis): OC(\C=C)(CC\C=C(/CC/C=C(\C)C)C)C; (trans): CC(=CCC/C(=C/CCC(C)(C=C)O)/C)C

Properties
Chemical formula	C_{15}H_{26}O
Molar mass	222.37 g/mol
Density	0.872 g/cm^{3}
Boiling point	122 °C (252 °F; 395 K) at 3 mmHg
Refractive index (n_{D})	1.4898
- Except where otherwise noted, data are given for materials in their standard state (at 25 °C [77 °F], 100 kPa). verify (what is ?) Infobox references

Nerolidol, also known as peruviol and penetrol, is a naturally occurring sesquiterpene alcohol. A colorless liquid, it is found in the essential oils of many types of plants and flowers. There are four isomers of nerolidol', which differ in the geometry about the central double bond and configuration of the hydroxyl-bearing carbon, but most applications use such a mixture. The aroma of nerolidol is woody and reminiscent of fresh bark. It is used as a flavoring agent and in perfumery as well as in non-cosmetic products such as detergents and cleansers. It has pronounced pharmacological properties: antimicrobial, antiparasitic, anti-inflammatory. Nerolidyl derivatives include nerolidyl diphosphate and the fragrance nerolidyl acetate.

== Synthesis and occurrence ==
Nerolidol is produced commercially from geranylacetone, e.g., by the addition of vinyl Grignard reagent. It is used as a source of farnesol, vitamin E, and vitamin K1.

Conversion of geranylacetone to nerolidol, which can be isomerized to farnesol.

Significant sources of natural nerolidol is Cabreuva oil and the oil of Dalbergia parviflora. It is also present in neroli, ginger, jasmine, lavender, tea tree, Cannabis sativa, and lemon grass, and is a dominant scent compound in Brassavola nodosa.

== See also ==
- Linalool
- Farnesol
- Geranylfarnesol
