= Fascaplysinopsis =

Scientific classification
- Kingdom: Animalia
- Phylum: Porifera
- Class: Demospongiae
- Order: Dictyoceratida
- Family: Thorectidae
- Genus: Fascaplysinopsis; Bergquist, 1980
- Species: F. reticulata

Binomial name
- Fascaplysinopsis reticulata (Hentschel, 1912)

Genus of sponges

Fascaplysinopsis is a monotypic genus of sponges belonging to the family Thorectidae. The only species is Fascaplysinopsis reticulata.

The species is found in Indian and Pacific Ocean.
