= Fasciospongia =

Scientific classification
- Domain: Eukaryota
- Kingdom: Animalia
- Phylum: Porifera
- Class: Demospongiae
- Order: Dictyoceratida
- Family: Thorectidae
- Subfamily: Thorectinae
- Genus: Fasciospongia; Burton, 1934

Synonyms
- Stelospongia Schulze, 1879; Stelospongos Schmidt, 1870; Stelospongus Ridley, 1884

Genus of sponges

Fasciospongia is a genus of sponges in the family Thorectidae.

== Species ==
- Fasciospongia anomala Dendy, 1905
- Fasciospongia benoiti Thomas, 1979
- Fasciospongia cacos Lendenfeld, 1889
- Fasciospongia caerulea Vacelet, 1959
- Fasciospongia cava Hentschel, 1912
- Fasciospongia cavernosa Schmidt, 1862
- Fasciospongia costifera Lamarck, 1814
- Fasciospongia cycni Lendenfeld, 1889
- Fasciospongia euplectella Hentschel, 1912
- Fasciospongia flabellum Lendenfeld, 1889
- Fasciospongia friabilis Hyatt, 1877
- Fasciospongia lordii Lendenfeld, 1889
- Fasciospongia ondaatjeana Lendenfeld, 1889
- Fasciospongia operculum Lendenfeld, 1897
- Fasciospongia pikei Hyatt, 1877
- Fasciospongia retiformis (Lendenfeld, 1889
- Fasciospongia rigida Lendenfeld, 1889
- Fasciospongia rimosa Lamarck, 1814
- Fasciospongia seychellensis Thomas, 1973
- Fasciospongia turgida Lamarck, 1814
