= Geranylgeraniol =

Names
- Preferred IUPAC name (2E,6E,10E)-3,7,11,15-Tetramethylhexadeca-2,6,10,14-tetraen-1-ol
- Other names Tetraprenol

Identifiers
CAS Number	7614-21-3
3D model (JSmol)	Interactive image
ChEBI	CHEBI:46762
ChemSpider	4444726
ECHA InfoCard	100.152.315
PubChem CID	5281365
UNII	AIA02AJA3A
CompTox Dashboard (EPA)	DTXSID001345665
- InChI: InChI=1S/C20H34O/c1-17(2)9-6-10-18(3)11-7-12-19(4)13-8-14-20(5)15-16-21/h9,11,13,15,21H,6-8,10,12,14,16H2,1-5H3/b18-11+,19-13+,20-15+ Key: OJISWRZIEWCUBN-QIRCYJPOSA-N; InChI=1/C20H34O/c1-17(2)9-6-10-18(3)11-7-12-19(4)13-8-14-20(5)15-16-21/h9,11,13,15,21H,6-8,10,12,14,16H2,1-5H3/b18-11+,19-13+,20-15+ Key: OJISWRZIEWCUBN-QIRCYJPOBA
- SMILES: OC/C=C(/CC/C=C(/CC\C=C(/C)CC\C=C(/C)C)C)C

Properties
Chemical formula	C_{20}H_{34}O
Molar mass	290.491 g·mol^{−1}
Appearance	colorless liquid
- Except where otherwise noted, data are given for materials in their standard state (at 25 °C [77 °F], 100 kPa). Infobox references

Geranylgeraniol is a diterpenoid alcohol. It is a colorless waxy solid. It is an important intermediate in the biosynthesis of other diterpenes, of vitamins E, and of K. It is a derivative of geranylgeraniol pyrophosphate, which is a precursor to carotenoids.

Geranylgeraniol is synthesized in humans through the mevalonate pathway.

As its pyrophosphate, it is also used in the post-translational modification by the process called geranylgeranylation.

Geranylgeraniol is a potent inhibitor of Mycobacterium tuberculosis in vitro.

== See also ==
- Geranylgeranyl pyrophosphate
- Geranylfarnesol
- Phytol
