= Geranylgeranyl pyrophosphate =

Names
- Preferred IUPAC name (2E,6E,10E)-3,7,11,15-Tetramethylhexadeca-2,6,10,14-tetraen-1-yl trihydrogen diphosphate
- Other names geranylgeranyl diphosphate trans-geranylgeranyl diphosphate

Identifiers
CAS Number	6699-20-3
3D model (JSmol)	Interactive image
ChEBI	CHEBI:48861
ChemSpider	394418
IUPHAR/BPS	3052
MeSH	geranylgeranyl+pyrophosphate
PubChem CID	447277
UNII	N21T0D88LX
CompTox Dashboard (EPA)	DTXSID90863929
- InChI: InChI=1S/C20H36O7P2/c1-17(2)9-6-10-18(3)11-7-12-19(4)13-8-14-20(5)15-16-26-29(24,25)27-28(21,22)23/h9,11,13,15H,6-8,10,12,14,16H2,1-5H3,(H,24,25)(H2,21,22,23)/b18-11+,19-13+,20-15+ Key: OINNEUNVOZHBOX-QIRCYJPOSA-N
- SMILES: O=P(O)(O)OP(=O)(O)OC/C=C(/CC\C=C(/C)CC\C=C(/C)CC\C=C(/C)C)C

Properties
Chemical formula	C_{20}H_{36}O_{7}P_{2}
Molar mass	450.449 g·mol^{−1}
- Except where otherwise noted, data are given for materials in their standard state (at 25 °C [77 °F], 100 kPa). Infobox references

Geranylgeranyl pyrophosphate is an intermediate in the biosynthesis of diterpenes and diterpenoids. It is also the precursor to carotenoids, gibberellins, tocopherols, and chlorophylls.

It is also a precursor to geranylgeranylated proteins, which is its primary use in human cells.

== Biosynthesis ==
The enzyme farnesyltranstransferase forms geranylgeranyl pyrophosphate from farnesyl pyrophosphate by the addition of an isoprene unit from isopentenyl pyrophosphate, with pyrophosphate (PP_{i}) as a byproduct.

farnesyl pyrophosphate
+
isopentenyl pyrophosphate
PP_{i}
geranylgeranyl pyrophosphate

In Drosophila, geranylgeranyl pyrophosphate is synthesised by HMG-CoA encoded by the Columbus gene. Geranylgeranyl pyrophosphate is utilised as a chemoattractant for migrating germ cells that have traversed the midgut epithelia. The attractant signal is produced at the gonadal precursors, directing the germ cells to these sites, where they will differentiate into eggs and spermatozoa (sperm).

== Related compounds ==
- Farnesyl pyrophosphate
- Geranylgeraniol
- Geranylfarnesol
- Geranyl pyrophosphate
