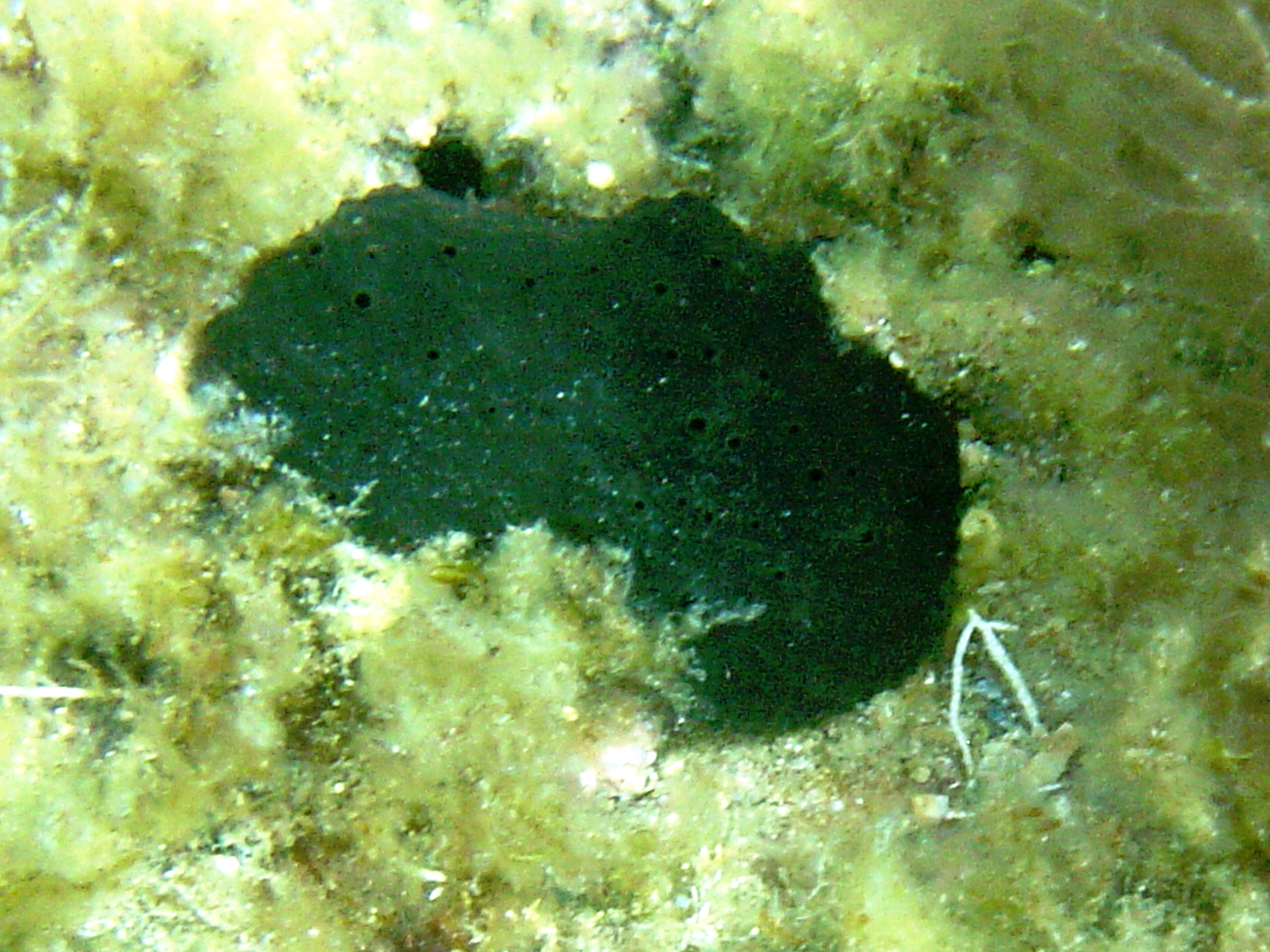
- Scalarispongia scalaris

Scientific classification
- Kingdom: Animalia
- Phylum: Porifera
- Class: Demospongiae
- Order: Dictyoceratida
- Family: Thorectidae; Bergquist, 1978

= Thorectidae =

Family of sponges

Thorectidae is a family of sea sponges in the order Dictyoceratida.

== Genera ==
- Subfamily Phyllospongiinae Keller, 1889
  - Candidaspongia Bergquist, Sorokin & Karuso, 1999
  - Carteriospongia Hyatt, 1877
  - Lendenfeldia Bergquist, 1980
  - Phyllospongia Ehlers, 1870
  - Strepsichordaia Bergquist, Ayling & Wilkinson, 1988
- Subfamily Thorectinae Bergquist, 1978
  - Aplysinopsis von Lendenfeld, 1888
  - Cacospongia Schmidt, 1862
  - Collospongia Bergquist, Cambie & Kernan, 1990
  - Dactylospongia Bergquist, 1965
  - Fascaplysinopsis Bergquist, 1980
  - Fasciospongia Burton, 1934
  - Fenestraspongia Bergquist, 1980
  - Hyrtios Duchassaing de Fonbressin & Michelotti, 1864
  - Luffariella Thiele, 1899
  - Narrabeena de Cook & Bergquist, 2002
  - Petrosaspongia Bergquist, 1995
  - Scalarispongia de Cook & Bergquist, 2000
  - Semitaspongia de Cook & Bergquist, 2000
  - Smenospongia Wiedenmayer, 1977
  - Taonura Carter, 1882
  - Thorecta von Lendenfeld, 1888
  - Thorectandra von Lendenfeld, 1889
  - Thorectaxia Pulitzer-Finali & Pronzato, 1999
