= Farnesol =

- Skeletal formula of farnesol

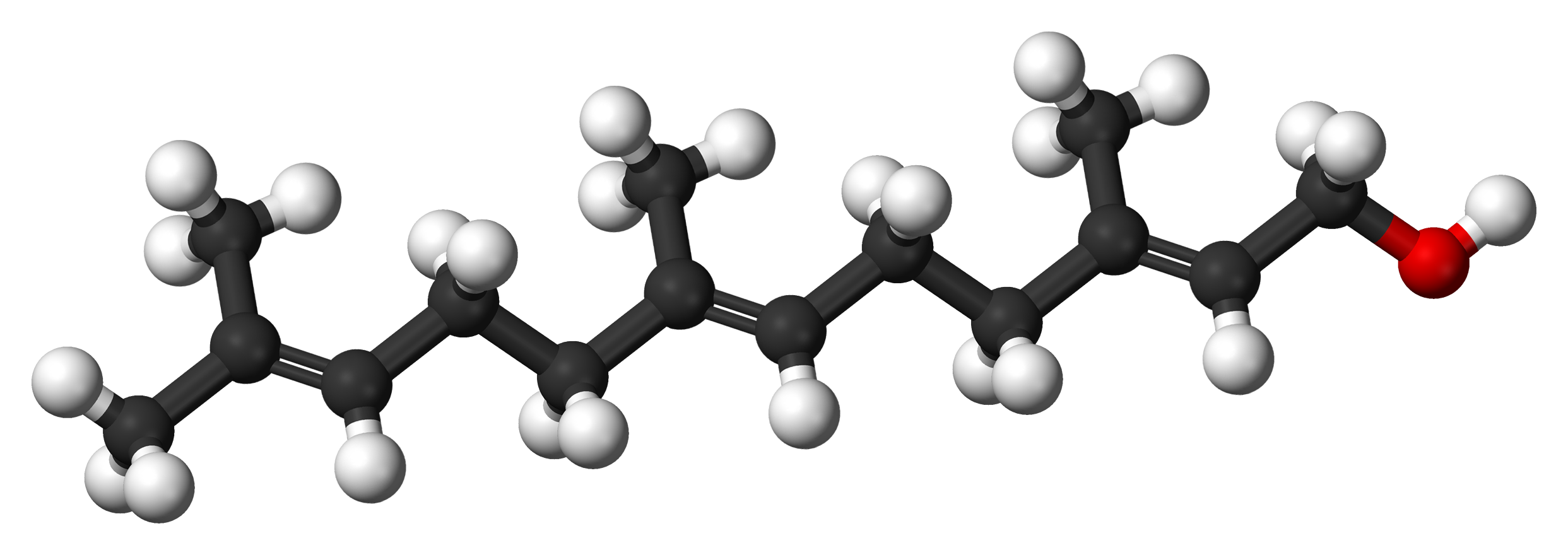
- Ball-and-stick model

Names
- Preferred IUPAC name (2E,6E)-3,7,11-Trimethyldodeca-2,6,10-trien-1-ol

Identifiers
CAS Number	4602-84-0
3D model (JSmol)	Interactive image; (2E,6E)-: Interactive image
ChEBI	CHEBI:28600
ChEMBL	ChEMBL25308
ChemSpider	3210; 392816 (2E,6E)-
DrugBank	DB02509
ECHA InfoCard	100.022.731
IUPHAR/BPS	3215
KEGG	C01493
PubChem CID	3327; 445070 (2E,6E)-
UNII	EB41QIU6JL
CompTox Dashboard (EPA)	DTXSID3032389
- InChI: InChI=1S/C15H26O/c1-13(2)7-5-8-14(3)9-6-10-15(4)11-12-16/h7,9,11,16H,5-6,8,10,12H2,1-4H3 Key: CRDAMVZIKSXKFV-UHFFFAOYSA-N; (2E,6E)-: InChI=1S/C15H26O/c1-13(2)7-5-8-14(3)9-6-10-15(4)11-12-16/h7,9,11,16H,5-6,8,10,12H2,1-4H3/b14-9+,15-11+ Key: CRDAMVZIKSXKFV-YFVJMOTDSA-N
- SMILES: OCC=C(CCC=C(CC\C=C(/C)C)C)C; (2E,6E)-: OC/C=C(/CC/C=C(/CC\C=C(/C)C)C)C

Properties
Chemical formula	C_{15}H_{26}O
Molar mass	222.37 g/mol
Appearance	Clear colorless liquid
Odor	Floral
Density	0.887 g/cm^{3}
Boiling point	283 to 284.00 °C (541.40 to 543.20 °F; 556.15 to 557.15 K) at 760 mmHg; 111 °C at 0.35 mmHg
- Except where otherwise noted, data are given for materials in their standard state (at 25 °C [77 °F], 100 kPa). verify (what is ?) Infobox references

Farnesol is a natural 15-carbon organic compound which is an acyclic sesquiterpene alcohol. Under standard conditions, it is a colorless liquid. It is hydrophobic, and thus insoluble in water, but miscible with oils. As the pyrophosphate ester, farnesol is a precursor to many terpenes and terpenoids. It is a constitutional isomer of Nerolidol.

== Uses ==
Farnesol is present in many essential oils such as citronella, neroli, cyclamen, lemon grass, tuberose, rose, musk, balsam, and tolu. It is used in perfumery to emphasize the odors of sweet, floral perfumes. It enhances perfume scent by acting as a co-solvent that regulates the volatility of the odorants. It is especially used in lilac and peony perfumes. Its aroma is described as "fresh, sweet, linden flower, floral, angelica, dry". Farnesol and its ester derivatives are important precursors for a variety of other compounds used as fragrances and vitamins.

=== Cosmetics ===
Farnesol is used as a deodorant in cosmetic products. Farnesol is subject to restrictions on its use in perfumery, because some people may become sensitised to it.

== Natural source and synthesis ==
=== In nature ===
The pyrophosphate ester of farnesol is the building blocks of possibly all acyclic sesquiterpenoids. These compounds are doubled to form 30-carbon squalene, which is the precursor for steroids in plants, animals, and fungi.

Farnesyl pyrophosphate is produced from the reaction of geranyl pyrophosphate and isopentenyl pyrophosphate. Farnesyl pyrophosphate is the precursor to farnesol and farnesene.

Farnesyl pyrophosphate

Farnesol is used by the fungus Candida albicans as a quorum sensing molecule that inhibits filamentation.

=== Commercial production ===
Obtaining farnesol from natural sources is uneconomical. In industry, farnesol is produced from linalool.

Conversion of geranylacetone to nerolidol, which can be isomerized to farnesol.

== History of the name ==
Farnesol was named (ca. 1900–1905) after the Farnese acacia tree (Vachellia farnesiana), since the flowers from the tree were the commercial source of the floral essence in which the chemical was identified. This particular acacia species, in turn, is named after Cardinal Odoardo Farnese (1573–1626) of the Italian Farnese family who (from 1550 though the 17th century) maintained some of the first private European botanical gardens in the Farnese Gardens in Rome. The addition of the -ol suffix implies an alcohol. The plant itself was brought to the Farnese gardens from the Caribbean and Central America, where it originates.

== See also ==
- Farnesylation
- Farnesene
- Farnesyl pyrophosphate
- Geranylgeraniol
- Geranylfarnesol
- Nerolidol
