= Farnesyl pyrophosphate =

- Skeletal formula

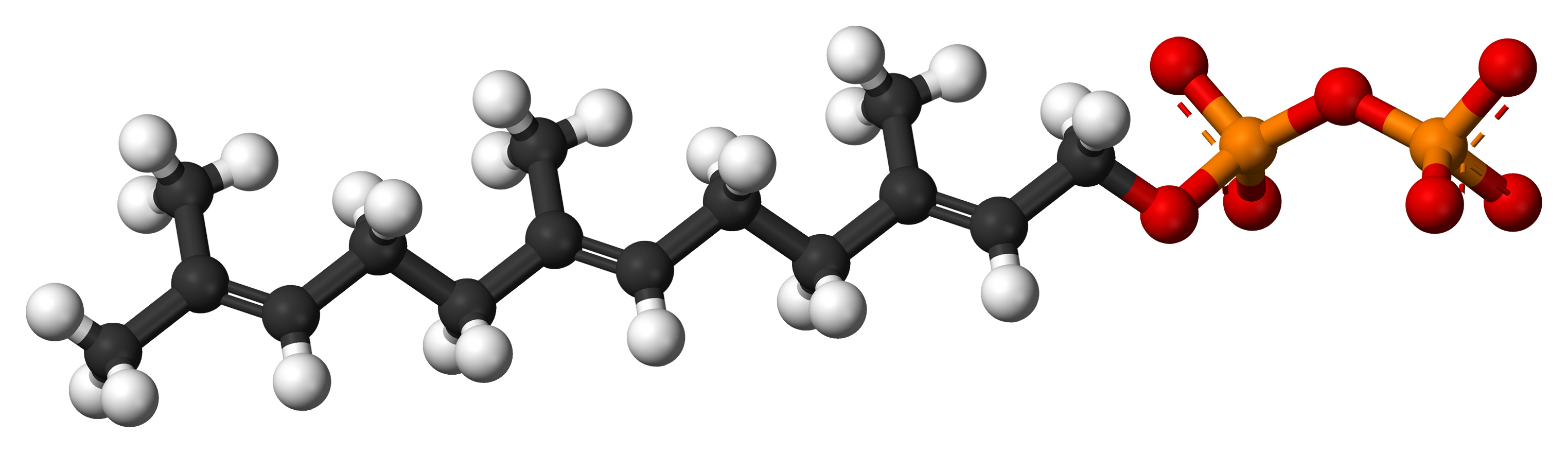
- Ball-and-stick model

Names
- Preferred IUPAC name (2E,6E)-3,7,11-Trimethyldodeca-2,6,10-trien-1-yl trihydrogen diphosphate

Identifiers
CAS Number	372-97-4
3D model (JSmol)	Interactive image
ChemSpider	393270
MeSH	farnesyl+pyrophosphate
PubChem CID	445713
UNII	G8X8WT527W
CompTox Dashboard (EPA)	DTXSID701020624
- InChI: InChI=1S/C15H28O7P2/c1-13(2)7-5-8-14(3)9-6-10-15(4)11-12-21-24(19,20)22-23(16,17)18/h7,9,11H,5-6,8,10,12H2,1-4H3,(H,19,20)(H2,16,17,18)/b14-9+,15-11+ Key: VWFJDQUYCIWHTN-YFVJMOTDSA-N
- SMILES: CC(=CCC/C(=C/CC/C(=C/COP(=O)(O)OP(=O)(O)O)/C)/C)C

Properties
Chemical formula	C_{15}H_{28}O_{7}P_{2}
Molar mass	382.330 g·mol^{−1}
- Except where otherwise noted, data are given for materials in their standard state (at 25 °C [77 °F], 100 kPa). verify (what is ?) Infobox references

Farnesyl pyrophosphate (FPP), also known as farnesyl diphosphate (FDP), is the precursor to all sesquiterpenes, which comprises thousands of compounds. These include all sesquiterpenes as well as sterols and carotenoids. It is also used in the synthesis of CoQ (part of the electron transport chain), as well as dehydrodolichol diphosphate (a precursor of dolichol, which transports proteins to the ER lumen for N-glycosylation).

== Biosynthesis ==
Farnesyl pyrophosphate synthase (a prenyl transferase) catalyzes sequential condensation reactions of dimethylallyl pyrophosphate with 2 units of 3-isopentenyl pyrophosphate to form farnesyl pyrophosphate:

== Pharmacology ==
The above reactions are inhibited by bisphosphonates (used for osteoporosis). Farnesyl pyrophosphate is a selective agonist of TRPV3.

== Related compounds ==
- Farnesene
- Farnesol
- Geranyl pyrophosphate
- Geranylgeranyl pyrophosphate
