= Geranylgeranyltransferase type III =

Protein coding gene in humans

GGTase3

Identifiers
- EC no.: 2.5.1.60

Databases
- BRENDA: enzyme data
- ExPASy: NiceZyme view
- KEGG: enzyme entry
- MetaCyc: metabolic pathway
- Rhea: reactions
- PDB structures: RCSB PDB PDBe PDBsum
- Gene Ontology: AmiGO / QuickGO
Search
- PMC: articles
- PubMed: articles
- NCBI: proteins

Geranylgeranyltransferase type III (GGTase3) is a protein prenyltransferase that in humans is encoded by the PTAR1 and RABGGTB genes.

GGTase3 is a recently identified protein prenyltransferase composed of two subunits: PTAR1 and RABGGTB. Currently, the ubiquitin ligase FBXL2 is the only identified target of GGTase3. GGTase3 catalyzes the geranylgeranylation of FBXL2 to facilitate its association with the cell membrane. Interestingly, despite having a C-terminal CaaX prenylation-motif that is typically recognized by GGTase1, FBXL2 is specifically recognized by GGTase3.

GGTase3 is classified as a transferase enzyme in the protein prenyltransferase family, along with three other enzymes: farnesyltransferase, geranylgeranyltransferase type-I, and rab geranylgeranyltransferase. The reaction catalyzed by GGTase3 can be summarized as follows:

Geranylgeranyl diphosphate + protein–cysteine = S-geranylgeranyl-protein + diphosphate

== See also ==
- Farnesyltransferase
- Geranylgeranyltransferase type I
- Rab geranylgeranyltransferase
