= Guanosine nucleotide dissociation inhibitor =

GDP dissociation inhibitor
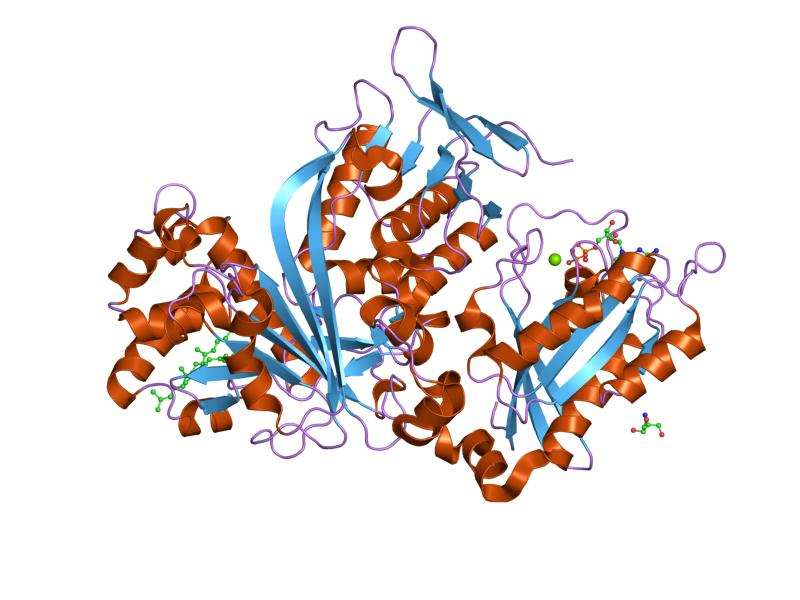
- structure of doubly prenylated ypt1:gdi complex

Identifiers
- Symbol: GDI
- Pfam: PF00996
- Pfam clan: CL0063
- InterPro: IPR018203
- SCOP2: 1gnd / SCOPe / SUPFAM
Available protein structures:
- PDB: 1ukvG:1-449 2bcgG:1-449 1lv0A:1-438 1gnd :1-430 1d5tA:1-431 1vg9E:5-542 1vg0A:5-542 1ltxR:5-542 IPR018203 PF00996 (ECOD; PDBsum)
- AlphaFold: IPR018203; PF00996

In molecular biology, the Guanosine dissociation inhibitors (GDIs) constitute a family of small GTPases that serve a regulatory role in vesicular membrane traffic. GDIs bind to the GDP-bound form of Rho and Rab small GTPases and not only prevent exchange (maintaining the small GTPase in an off-state), but also prevent the small GTPase from localizing at the membrane, which is their place of action. This inhibition can be removed by the action of a GDI displacement factor. GDIs also inhibit cdc42 by binding to its tail and preventing its insertion into membranes; hence it cannot trigger WASPs and cannot lead to nucleation of F-actin.

The GDIs' C-terminal geranylgeranylation is crucial for their membrane association and function. This post-translational modification is catalysed by Rab geranylgeranyl transferase (Rab-GGTase), a multi-subunit enzyme that contains a catalytic heterodimer and an accessory component, termed Rab escort protein (REP)-1. REP-1 presents newly synthesised Rab proteins to the catalytic component, and forms a stable complex with the prenylated proteins following the transfer reaction. The mechanism of REP-1-mediated membrane association of Rab5 is similar to that mediated by Rab GDP dissociation inhibitor (GDI). REP-1 and Rab GDI also share other functional properties, including the ability to inhibit the release of GDP and to remove Rab proteins from membranes.

The crystal structure of the bovine alpha-isoform of Rab GDI has been determined to a resolution of 1.81 Angstrom. The protein is composed of two main structural units: a large complex multi-sheet domain I, and a smaller alpha-helical domain II.

The structural organisation of domain I is closely related to FAD-containing monooxygenases and oxidases. Conserved regions common to GDI and the choroideraemia gene product, which delivers Rab to catalytic subunits of Rab geranylgeranyltransferase II, are clustered on one face of the domain. The two most conserved regions form a compact structure at the apex of the molecule; site-directed mutagenesis has shown these regions to play a critical role in the binding of Rab proteins.
