= Lipid-anchored protein =

Membrane protein

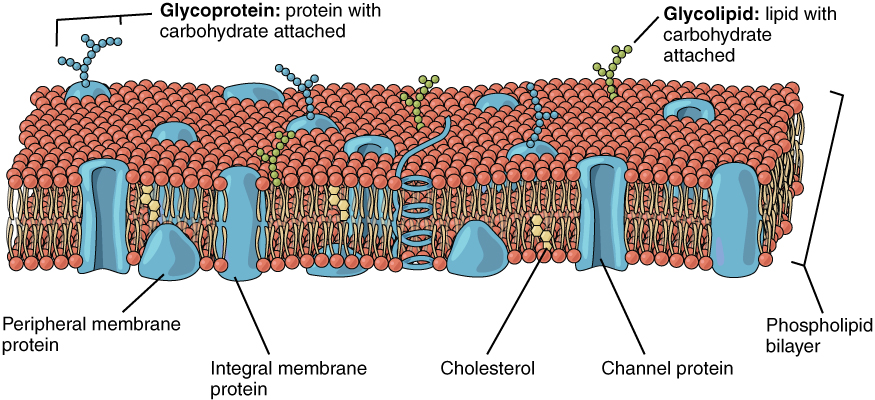
Lipid membrane with various proteins

Lipid-anchored proteins (also known as lipid-linked proteins) are proteins that are covalently attached to lipids embedded into biological membranes. The lipid-anchored protein can be located on either side of the cell membrane. Thus, the lipid serves to anchor the protein to the cell membrane. Such proteins are a type of proteolipids.

The lipid groups contribute to the intracellular localization and the biological function of the protein to which they are attached. The lipid serves as a mediator of the protein association with specific biological membranes and protein-protein interactions. The lipidation can also sequester a protein away from its substrate to inactivate the protein and then activate it by substrate presentation.

Overall, there are three main types of lipid-anchored proteins which include prenylated proteins, fatty acylated proteins and glycosylphosphatidylinositol-linked proteins (GPI). A protein can have multiple lipid groups covalently attached to specific amino acid residues.

== Prenylated proteins ==
Isoprene unit

Prenylated proteins are proteins with covalently attached hydrophobic isoprene polymers (i.e. branched five-carbon hydrocarbon) at cysteine residues of the protein. More specifically, these isoprenoid groups, usually farnesyl (15-carbon) and geranylgeranyl (20-carbon) are attached to the protein via thioether linkages at cysteine residues near the C terminal of the protein. This prenylation of lipid chains to proteins facilitate their interaction with the cell membrane.

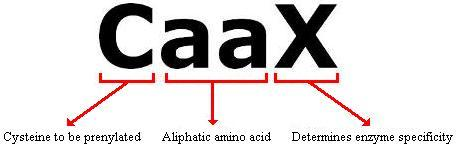
Caax Box

The prenylation motif "CaaX box" is the most common prenylation site in proteins, that is, the site where farnesyl or geranylgeranyl covalently attach. In the CaaX box sequence, the C represents the cysteine that is prenylated, the A represents any aliphatic amino acid and the X determines the type of prenylation that will occur. If the X is an Ala, Met, Ser or Gln the protein will be farnesylated via the farnesyltransferase enzyme and if the X is a Leu then the protein will be geranylgeranylated via the geranylgeranyltransferase I enzyme. Both of these enzymes are similar with each containing two subunits.

=== Roles and function ===
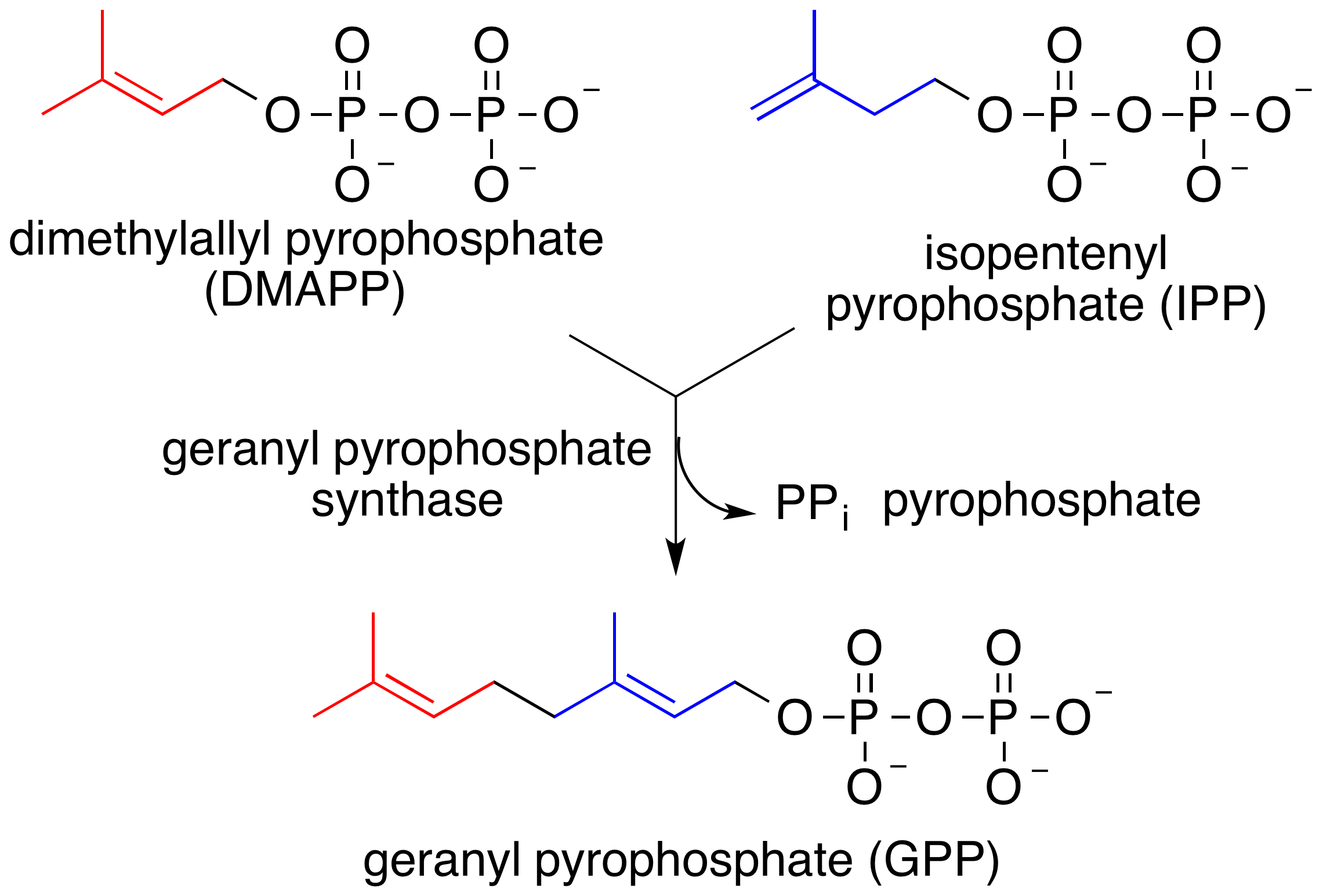
Prenylation chains (e.g. geranyl pyrophosphate)

Prenylated proteins are particularly important for eukaryotic cell growth, differentiation and morphology. Furthermore, protein prenylation is a reversible post-translational modification to the cell membrane. This dynamic interaction of prenylated proteins with the cell membrane is important for their signalling functions and is often deregulated in disease processes such as cancer. More specifically, Ras is the protein that undergoes prenylation via farnesyltransferase and when it is switched on it can turn on genes involved in cell growth and differentiation. Thus overactiving Ras signalling can lead to cancer. An understanding of these prenylated proteins and their mechanisms have been important for the drug development efforts in combating cancer. Other prenylated proteins include members of the Rab and Rho families as well as lamins.

Some important prenylation chains that are involved in the HMG-CoA reductase metabolic pathway are geranylgeraniol, farnesol and dolichol. These isoprene polymers (e.g. geranyl pyrophosphate and farnesyl pyrophosphate) are involved in the condensations via enzymes such as prenyltransferase that eventually cyclizes to form cholesterol.

== Fatty acylated proteins ==
Fatty acylated proteins are proteins that have been post-translationally modified to include the covalent attachment of fatty acids at certain amino acid residues. The most common fatty acids that are covalently attached to the protein are the saturated myristic (14-carbon) acid and palmitic acid (16-carbon). Proteins can be modified to contain either one or both of these fatty acids.

Myristoylation

=== N-myristoylation ===
N-myristoylation (i.e. attachment of myristic acid) is generally an irreversible protein modification that typically occurs during protein synthesis in which the myrisitc acid is attached to the α-amino group of an N-terminal glycine residue through an amide linkage. This reaction is facilitated by N-myristoyltransferase . These proteins usually begin with a Met-Gly sequence and with either a serine or threonine at position 5. Proteins that have been myristoylated are involved in signal transduction cascade, protein-protein interactions and in mechanisms that regulate protein targeting and function. An example in which the myristoylation of a protein is important is in apoptosis, programmed cell death. After the protein BH3 interacting-domain death agonist (Bid) has been myristoylated, it targets the protein to move to the mitochondrial membrane to release cytochrome c, which then ultimately leads to cell death. Other proteins that are myristoylated and involved in the regulation of apoptosis are actin and gelsolin.

=== S-palmitoylation ===
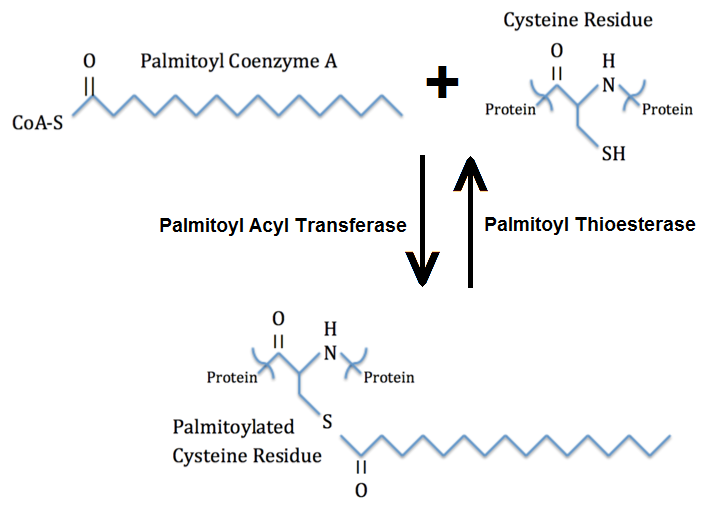
Palmitoylation

S-palmitoylation (i.e. attachment of palmitic acid) is a reversible protein modification in which a palmitic acid is attached to a specific cysteine residue via thioester linkage. The term S-acylation can also be used when other medium and long fatty acids chains are also attached to palmitoylated proteins. No consensus sequence for protein palmitoylation has been identified. Palmitoylated proteins are mainly found on the cytoplasmic side of the plasma membrane where they play a role in transmembrane signaling. The palmitoyl group can be removed by palmitoyl thioesterases. It is believed that this reverse palmitoylation may regulate the interaction of the protein with the membrane and thus have a role in signaling processes. Furthermore, this allows for the regulation of protein subcellular localization, stability and trafficking. An example in which palmitoylation of a protein plays a role in cell signaling pathways is in the clustering of proteins in the synapse. When the postsynaptic density protein 95 (PSD-95) is palmitoylated, it is restricted to the membrane and allows it to bind to and cluster ion channels in the postsynaptic membrane. Thus, palmitoylation can play a role in the regulation of neurotransmitter release.

Palmitoylation mediates the affinity of a protein for lipid rafts and facilitates the clustering of proteins. The clustering can increase the proximity of two molecules. Alternatively, clustering can sequester a protein away from a substrate. For example, palmitoylation of phospholipase D sequesters the enzyme away from its substrate phosphatidylcholine. When cholesterol levels decrease or PIP_{2} levels increase the palmitate mediated localization is disrupted, the enzyme trafficks to PIP_{2} where it encounters its substrate and is active by substrate presentation.

== GPI proteins ==
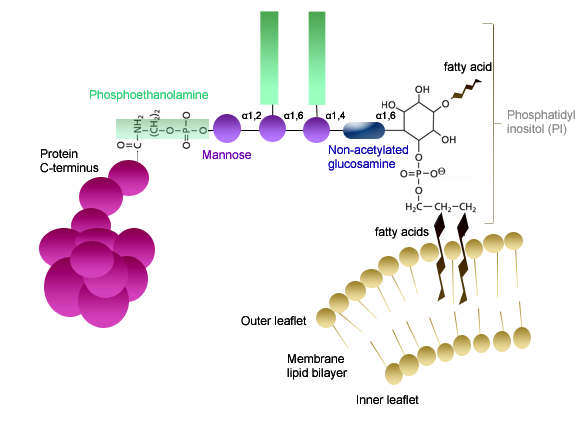
Structure of the glycophosphatidylinositol anchor in the plasma membrane of a eukaryotic cell

Glycosylphosphatidylinositol-anchored proteins (GPI-anchored proteins) are attached to a GPI complex molecular group via an amide linkage to the protein's C-terminal carboxyl group. This GPI complex consists of several main components that are all interconnected: a phosphoethanolamine, a linear tetrasaccharide (composed of three mannose and a glucosaminyl) and a phosphatidylinositol. The phosphatidylinositol group is glycosidically linked to the non-N-acetylated glucosamine of the tetrasaccharide. A phosphodiester bond is then formed between the mannose at the nonreducing end (of the tetrasaccaride) and the phosphoethanolamine. The phosphoethanolamine is then amide linked to the C-terminal of the carboxyl group of the respective protein. The GPI attachment occurs through the action of GPI-transamidase complex. The fatty acid chains of the phosphatidylinositol are inserted into the membrane and thus are what anchor the protein to the membrane. These proteins are only located on the exterior surface of the plasma membrane.

=== Roles and function ===
The sugar residues in the tetrasaccharide and the fatty acid residues in the phosphatidylinositol group vary depending on the protein. This great diversity is what allows the GPI proteins to have a wide range of functions including acting as hydrolytic enzymes, adhesion molecule, receptors, protease inhibitor and complement regulatory proteins. Furthermore, GPI proteins play an important in embryogenesis, development, neurogenesis, the immune system and fertilization. More specifically, the GPI protein IZUMO1R (also named JUNO after the Roman goddess of fertility) on the egg plasma has an essential role in sperm-egg fusion. Releasing the IZUMO1R (JUNO) GPI protein from the egg plasma membrane does not allow for sperm to fuse with the egg and it is suggested that this mechanism may contribute to the polyspermy block at the plasma membrane in eggs. Other roles that GPI modification allows for is in the association with membrane microdomains, transient homodimerization or in apical sorting in polarized cells.
