= CEFIP =

Mammalian protein found in Homo sapiens

C10orf71

Identifiers
- Aliases: C10orf71, chromosome 10 open reading frame 71, CEFIP
- External IDs: MGI: 3588196; GeneCards: C10orf71

Gene location (Human)
| Chr. | Chromosome 10 (human) |
| Band | 10q11.23 | Start | 49,299,170 bp |
| Band | 10q11.23 | End | 49,327,492 bp |

Gene location (Mouse)
| Chr. | Chromosome 14 (mouse) |
| Band | 14|14 B | Start | 32,381,076 bp |
| Band | 14|14 B | End | 32,407,250 bp |
RNA expression pattern
| Bgee | Human / Mouse (ortholog); Top expressed in: Skeletal muscle tissue of rectus abdominis; muscle of thigh; myocardium of left ventricle; tibialis anterior muscle; quadriceps femoris muscle; vastus lateralis muscle; biceps brachii; Skeletal muscle tissue of biceps brachii; cardiac muscle tissue of right atrium; gastrocnemius muscle / Top expressed in: interventricular septum; left ventricle; skeletal muscle tissue; muscle of thigh; quadriceps femoris muscle; zone of skin; lip; esophagus; yolk sac; embryo; More reference expression data |
| BioGPS | n/a |
Gene ontology
| Molecular function | protein binding |
| Cellular component | Z discdkac; cytoplasm |
| Biological process | positive regulation of calcineurin-NFAT signaling cascade |
Sources:Amigo / QuickGO
Orthologs
| Databases | NCBI: entry; OMA: entry |
| Species | Human | Mouse |
| Entrez | 118461 | 100504518 |
| Ensembl | ENSG00000177354 | ENSMUSG00000071540 |
| UniProt | Q711Q0 | D3Z1D3 |
| RefSeq (mRNA) | NM_001135196; NM_199459 | NM_001195097 |
| RefSeq (protein) | NP_001128668 | NP_001182026 |
| Location (UCSC) | Chr 10: 49.3 – 49.33 Mb | Chr 14: 32.38 – 32.41 Mb |
| PubMed search |
- Wikidata
| View/Edit Human | View/Edit Mouse |

Cardiac-enriched FHL2-interacting protein (CEFIP) is a protein encoded by the gene C10orf71 on chromosome 10 open reading frame 71. It is primarily understood that this gene is moderately expressed in muscle tissue and cardiac tissue.

== Gene ==
The cytogenic locus is found at 10q11.23. C10orf71 encodes 28294 base pairs (bp) within chromosome 10 at 49299193-49327487 bp. It is located on the plus strand and is flanked by several other genes.

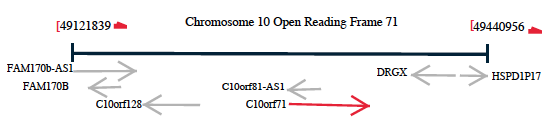
Chromosome 10 representation showing C10orf71 location and other neighboring genes it is flanked by.

== mRNA ==
The mRNA sequence of C10orf71 has 3 exons and 10 stop codons in the favorable splice form. The two alternative splice forms had 47 and 75 stop codons interspersed throughout the sequence so they were not utilized to obtain further sequence information. The main splice form that was analyzed had the ten stop codons interspersed throughout the 5' and 3' UTR, which was why this splice form was utilized to further analyze. The mRNA of the Homo sapiens ortholog of C10orf71was 5286 bp in length.

Alternative splice forms of C10orf7
| Splice 1 | Stop Codons found starting at bp: 4, 150, 247, 310, 4645, 4774, 4783, 4855, 4986, and 5250 Exons found between bp: 431/432, 544/545, and 5285/5286 Kozak site found at bp 332-334 |
| Splice 2 | 47 Stop Codons found interspersed throughout the entire sequence |
| Splice 3 | 75 stop codons found interspersed throughout the entire sequence |

The three alternative splice forms found of C10orf71 mRNA sequence and the locations stop codons, exons and the Kozak site found in Splice 1. Splice 1 was utilized to analyze and obtain information about as all of the stop codons found in this splice form were found in the 5' and 3' UTR regions of the sequence. There were three exons found in Splice 1 with a Kozak consensus sequence in the overall sequence as well.

== Protein ==
The mature Homo sapiens homolog of the CEFIP protein encoded by C10orf71 is 1435 amino acids (aa) in length and weighs approximately 156.5 kDa. This homolog has an isoelectric point of 5.94. The range of pH values from Homo sapiens to the latest ortholog analyzed, Rhincodon types, ranged from 5.94-6.93, with it gradually increasing as it went later in the divergence of the ortholog.

| Species | Length (aa) | Molecular Weight (kDa) | Isoelectric point |
|---|---|---|---|
| Homo sapiens | 1,435 | 156.5 | 5.94 |
| Gorilla gorilla | 1,435 | 156.2 | 5.91 |
| Mus muculus | 1,412 | 154.5 | 5.81 |
| Gallus gallus | 1,521 | 167.7 | 6.15 |
| Rhincodon typus | 1,253 | 138.8 | 6.93 |

Comparison of some of the orthologs analyzed when compared to Homo sapiens. The orthologs are arranged from species that are most closely related to the Homo sapiens ortholog to least closely related (top to bottom respectively).

=== Composition of protein ===
CEFIP is predicted to be a non-transmembrane, soluble protein. It is predicted to be a nuclear protein with 91.3% confidence with it being fairly confident to be a nuclear protein throughout the orthologs. There was one positive charge cluster found in CEFIP protein sequence, that is located from amino acids 1165–1193. This cluster was moderately conserved throughout the orthologs analyzed. There was also a mixed charge cluster found in the Homo sapiens' sequence of this protein, located from amino acid 750–778, although this cluster was not highly conserved throughout the analyzed orthologs. There was one repeat sequence found as well, TASKPPA, located at amino acids 163-169 and 116–1172. This protein is Proline and Serine rich as well.

Predicted C10orf71 location in orthologs.
| Species | Nuclear | Cytoplasmic | Cytoskeletal |
|---|---|---|---|
| Homo sapiens | 91.3% | 4.3% | 4.3% |
| Gorilla gorilla | 91.3% | 4.3% | 4.3% |
| Mus musculus | 82.6% | 13.0% | — |
| Gallus gallus | 69.6% | 17.4% | 4.3% |
| Rhincodon typus | 69.6% | 21.7% | — |

This cartoon represents the basic layout of the CEFIP protein. The overall protein is represented by the orange rectangle, DUF4585 is represented by the blue pentagon, VAC is represented by the green oval, nuclear localization signals are represented by the gray diamonds and N-glycosylation sites are represented by the red diamonds.

=== Domains and motifs ===
One confirmed domain of unknown function (DUF) was found within the CEFIP protein sequence, DUF4585. DUF4585 is located on the Homo sapiens protein sequence from amino acid 311–334. DUF4585 was highly conserved throughout the orthologs that were analyzed. There was also a small vacuolar targeting motif (VAC) found within the analyzed protein sequence spanning amino acids 543–546.

=== Protein structure ===
The mature CEFIP protein contains nuclear localization signals (NLS), pat4 (RKPK at aa 382, RPRK at aa 640, KRRK at aa 1190) and pat7 (PPWRKPK at aa 379 and PWRKPKT at aa 380) with an NLS score of 0.94. A secondary structure was constructed with a 6.1% confidence level.

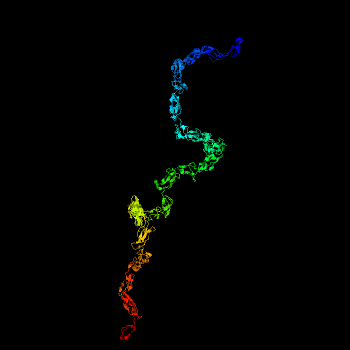
Predicted CEFIP protein structure.

=== Post-translational modifications ===
There were seven GlcNAc O-glycosylation sites predicted within the protein sequence found at amino acids 116, 120, 139, 165, 468, 470, and 844. There were also several phosphorylation sites found interspersed throughout the sequence. One propeptide cleavage site was predicted at amino acid 38. There were three predicted sumoylation sites found at amino acids 599, 890, and 1176.

=== Expression ===
The C10orf71 mRNA was found to be highly expressed in cardiac, muscle, and liver tissue (biology).

=== Regulation of expression ===
There were 6 possible promoters found in the sequence. Promoter GXP_6729162 is 1403 bp in length. This promoter had several transcription factors of interest including those involved with myocytes.

=== Function ===
There is little scientific information known about the function of CEFIP.

=== Interacting proteins ===
There was a total of 25 proteins generated that were predicted to interact with CEFIP (Homo sapiens ortholog). Most of the interactions predicted were physical interactions with CEFIP. These interactions were discovered through a variety of mechanisms including, but not limited to: affinity chromatography, microarray analysis, and tandem mass spectrometry among others. Refer to table for details about the interacting proteins of CEFIP.

| Interacting Protein | Name of Protein | Known Function | Location Expressed or Associated Diseases |
|---|---|---|---|
| C20orf78 | Chromosome 20 Open Reading Frame 78 | Unknown | Unconfirmed |
| BPIFA2 | BPI Fold Containing Family A Member 2 | Plays a role in antibacterial resistance in upper respiratory pathway | Expressed in salivary glands |
| PPIL6 | Peptidyl Prolyl Isomerase Like 6 | Accelerates folding of proteins | Unconfirmed |
| KIF17 | Kinesin Family Member 17 | Transports vesicles containing NMDA receptor 2B | Expressed in microtubules |
| KRT78 | Keratin 78 | Forms cytoplasmic network; encodes proteins with intermediate filament domains | Expressed in intermediate filaments |
| TBX4 | T-box4 Transcription Factor | Encode transcription factors involved in regulation of developmental processes; assists with regulation of mesoderm differentiation; could play a role in limb pattern formation | Associated with Small Patella Syndrome and Heritable Pulmonary Arterial Hypertension |
| DNAH8 | Dynein Axonemal Heavy Chain 8 | heavy chain of an axonemal dynein involved in sperm and respiratory cilia motility. | Associated with Colchicine Resistance and Mitochondrial Complex V Deficiency, Nuclear Type 1 |
| TSPAN17 | Tetraspanin 17 | Predicted to regulate ADAM10 maturation | Unconfirmed |
| C14orf80 | Chromosome 14 Open Reading Frame 80 | Unknown | Unconfirmed |
| SLC35F4 | Solute Carrier Family 35 Member F4 | Solute transporter | Unconfirmed |
| LHX4 | LIM Homeobox 4 | Predicted to play a role in maturing lungs, development of respiratory mechanisms, and development of the pituitary gland | Associated with Pituitary Hormone Deficiency, Combined 4 and Lhx4=Related Combined Pituitary Hormone |
| FAM53A | Family With Sequence Similarity 53 Member A | Plays a role in neural development | Possibly expressed in ventricle tissue |
| GRIK5 | Glutamate Ionotropic Receptor Kainase Type Subunit 5 | Forms functional heteromeric kainite-preferring ionic channels | Associated with Schizophrenia |
| FADS2 | Fatty Acid Denaturase 2 | Regulates unsaturation of fatty acids through introduction of double bonds between define Cysteines of the fatty acid chains | Associated with Best Vitelliform Macular Dystrophy |
| GDF2 | Growth Differentiation Factor 2 | Regulates cartilage and bone development; differentiation of cholinergic receptors in CNS | Unconfirmed |
| C17orf77 | Chromosome 17 Open Reading Frame 77 | Unknown | Unconfirmed |
| CFAP45 (CCDC19) | Cilia And Flagella Associated Protein 45 | Associated with pharynx cancer | Unconfirmed |
| DCST2 | DC-STAMP Domain Containing 2 | Unknown | Unconfirmed |
| CTXN1 | Cortexin 1 | Predicted to play a role in IC or EC signaling of the cortical neurons during the development of the forebrain. | Unconfirmed |
| C19orf68 | Chromosome 19 Open Reading Frame 68 | Unknown | Unconfirmed |
| DCAF7 | DDB1 And CUL4 Associated Factor 7 | It's been shown to function as a scaffold protein in kinase signaling. It's also been known to be involved with craniofacial development | Unconfirmed |
| DYRK1A | Dual Specificity YAK1-Related Kinase | May play a role in brain development and cell proliferation; nuclear localized protein | Associated with Mental Retardation, Autosomal Dominant 7 and Microcephaly |
| DYRK1B | Dual Specificity Tyrosine-(Y)-Phosphorylation Regulated Kinase 1B | Plays a role in the cell cycle; nuclear-localized protein | Associated with Abdominal Obesity-Metabolic Syndrome 3 and Abdominal Obesity-Metabolic Syndrome |
| FNTA | Protein Farnesyltransferase/Geranylgeranyltransferase Type-1 Subunit Alpha | Helps regulate neuromuscular junction development | Unconfirmed |
| FNTB | Protein Farnesyltransferase Subunit Beta | Catalyzes the transfer of a farnesyl moiety from farnesyl diphosphate to a cysteine | Unconfirmed |

Interacting proteins, their function if known, and any tissues they have been found or predicted to be expressed in and any diseases they have been associated with.

== Homologs ==
=== Paralogs ===
There are currently no known paralogs to the C10orf71 gene.

=== Orthologs ===
C10orf71 is known to have 68 orthologs in various species including primates (11 species), rodents (8 species), Laurasiatheria carnivores (14 species), Placental mammals (38 species), Sauropsida birds and reptiles (7 species), and fish (11 species). The highly conserved sequences are primarily from primates with the identity percentage of these species being >90%, whereas species such as reptiles, birds, and fish had an identity percentage ≤30%. Refer to table for additional information on dates of divergence, sequence length, and sequence identity and similarity for orthologs. C10orf71 is not present in prokaryotes, archaea, or fungi.

| Abbreviation (for Phylogenetic Tree) | Species | Common Name | Protein Accession # | Estimated Date of Divergence (MYA) | Sequence length (aa) | Sequence identity to Human mRNA/protein (%) | Sequence similarity to Human mRNA/protein (%) |
|---|---|---|---|---|---|---|---|
| HomS | Homo sapiens | human | NP_001128668.1 | | 1435 | 100 | 100 |
| GorG | Gorilla gorilla | western gorilla | XP_018889898.1 | 9.06 | 1435 | 98.3 | 98.7 |
| RhiR | Rhinopithecus roxellana | Golden snub-nosed monkey | XP_010381152.1 | 29.44 | 1435 | 93.4 | 95.3 |
| OtoG | Otolemur garnettii | small-eared galago | XP_003801705.1 | 74 | 1419 | 74.9 | 81.5 |
| TupC | Tupaia chinensis | Chinese tree shrew | XP_014439281.1 | 82 | 1186 | 61.5 | 67.8 |
| MusM | Mus musculus | house mouse | NP_001182026.1 | 90 | 1412 | 65.4 | 74.3 |
| OctD | Octodon degus | Common degu | XP_004647022.1 | 90 | 1407 | 63.3 | 73.1 |
| HetG | Heterocephalus glaber | Naked mole-rat | XP_004874589.1 | 90 | 1411 | 63.2 | 73.3 |
| CerS | Ceratotherium simum simum | Southern white rhinoceros | XP_004432504.1 | 96 | 1436 | 74 | 81 |
| OrcO | Orcinus orca | killer whale | XP_004286436 | 96 | 1433 | 72.6 | 79.4 |
| LoxA | Loxodonta Africana | African bush elephant | XP_003408977.1 | 105 | 1438 | 65.5 | 74.5 |
| SarH | Sarcophilus harrisii | Tasmanian devil | XP_003755230.2 | 159 | 1470 | 49.0 | 62.5 |
| GavG | Gavialis gangeticus | crocodile | XP_019358113.1 | 312 | 1538 | 32.8 | 46.7 |
| TinG | Tinamus guttatus | White-throated tinamou | XP_010216992.1 | 312 | 1529 | 32.4 | 46.3 |
| PelS | Pelodiscus sinensis | turtle | XP_006118195.1 | 312 | 1505 | 32.0 | 46.2 |
| GalG | Gallus gallus | chicken | XP_421655.3 | 312 | 1521 | 30.5 | 44.7 |
| MelU | Melopsittacus undulates | parrot | XP_005153970 | 312 | 1538 | 30.3 | 45.1 |
| OreN | Oreochromis niloticus | Nile tilapia | XP_019221822 | 435 | 661 | 12.0 | 18.7 |
| SclF | Scleropages formosus | Asian arowana | XP_018580403 | 435 | 3125 | 11.5 | 17.9 |
| DanR | Danio rerio | Zebrafish | XP_005157004.1 | 435 | 3591 | 9.2 | 16.0 |
| CluH | Clupea harengus | Atlantic herring | XP_012687674.1 | 435 | 3633 | 9.1 | 13.8 |
| RhiT | Rhincodon typus | whale shark | XP_020385611.1 | 473 | 1253 | 40.0 | 24.8 |

Ortholog table in descending order to latest ortholog diverged. This table compares the orthologs analyzed, their species names, common names, dates of divergence from Homo sapiens ortholog (MYA), length (aa), and percentage of similarity and identity.

=== Phylogeny ===
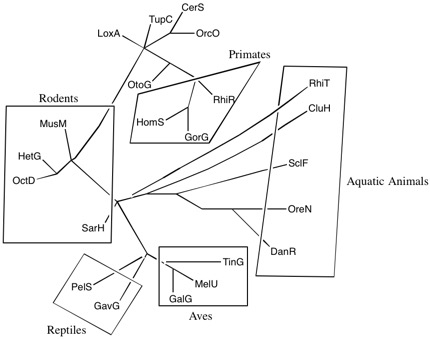
A phylogenic tree created from the orthologs. They are grouped in similar animal species. The branches are labeled with the four letter code given to them, full species name and common names of these codes can be found in table above.

A phylogenetic tree was constructed for the orthologs that were analyzed in comparison to Homo sapiens. With the species of latest divergence being Rhincodon types, or the whale shark.

=== Evolutionary rate ===
C10orf71's rate of divergence was faster than that of fibrinogen or Cytochrome C.

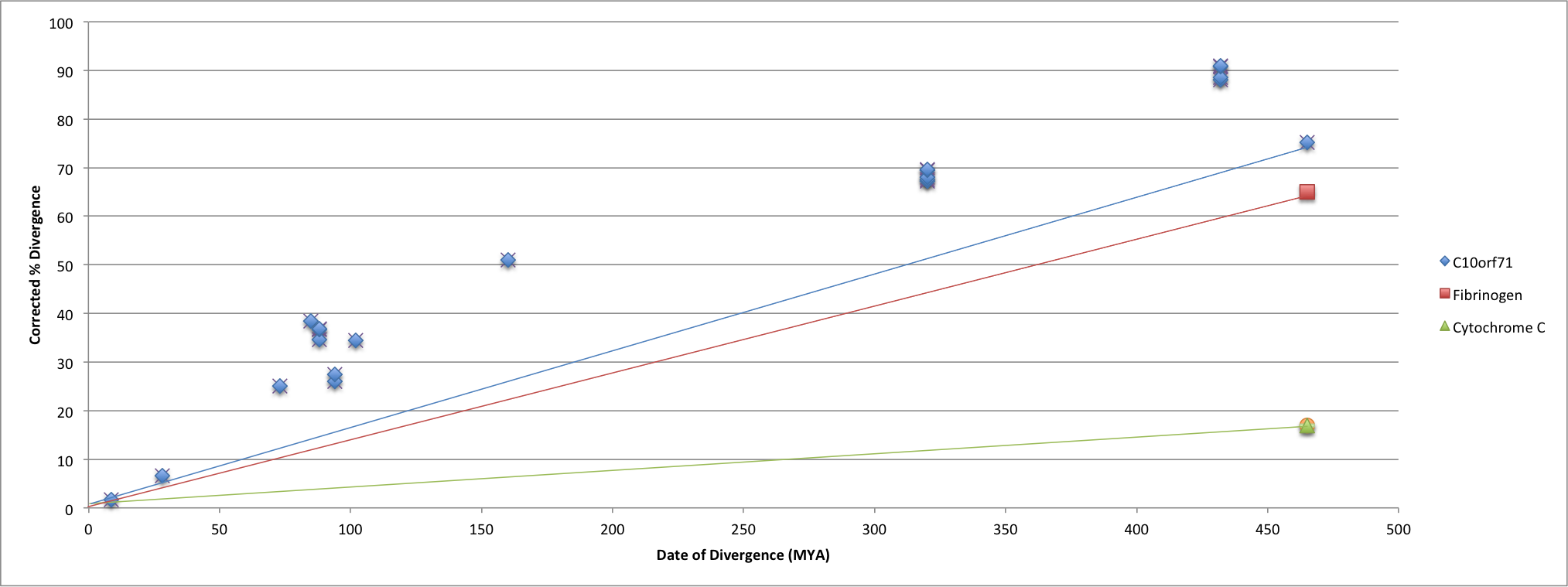
The corrected % of divergence compared to the date of divergence for the orthologs. The ortholog points on the graph can be identified by referring to table above. C10orf71 (blue line) appears to have diverged faster than both Fibrinogens (red line) and Cytochrome C (green line). The correct % of divergence was calculated using the equation m/100 = –ln(1- n/100) where m= total number of amino acid changes which have occurred in a 100-amino-acid segment of a protein and n=observed number of amino acid changes per 100 residues.

== Clinical significance ==
There was a microarray experiment that also showed evidence that C10orf71's expression was lowered in skeletal muscle tissues that experienced sepsis. There was clinical significance found in the expression level of C10orf71 in an experiment looking at those with Myotonic dystrophy. One microarray analysis produced results that showed C10orf71's expression level decreased in those with prostate cancer as well.
