= Geranylgeranyl-diphosphate:protein-cysteine geranyltransferase =

Geranylgeranyl-diphosphate:protein-cysteine geranyltransferase may refer to:

- Protein geranylgeranyltransferase type I
- Protein geranylgeranyltransferase type II
