= PTAR1 =

Protein-coding gene in humans

Identifiers
- Aliases: PTAR1, protein prenyltransferase alpha subunit repeat containing 1
- External IDs: MGI: 1921875; GeneCards: PTAR1

Gene location (Human)
Chr.	Chromosome 9 (human)
Band	9q21.12	Start	69,709,522 bp
Band	9q21.12	End	69,759,959 bp

Gene location (Mouse)
Chr.	Chromosome 19 (mouse)
Band	19|19 B	Start	23,664,793 bp
Band	19|19 B	End	23,709,032 bp
RNA expression pattern
Bgee	Human / Mouse (ortholog); Top expressed in: thymus; pancreatic epithelial cell; endothelial cell; mucosa of ileum; tibialis anterior muscle; cartilage tissue; skin of arm; pancreatic ductal cell; visceral pleura; deltoid muscle / Top expressed in: otic vesicle; aortic valve; ascending aorta; spermatid; spermatocyte; medullary collecting duct; hand; lobe of cerebellum; molar; otolith organ; More reference expression data
BioGPS	n/a
Gene ontology
Molecular function	transferase activity; prenyltransferase activity; protein prenyltransferase activity
Cellular component	cytoplasm; transferase complex
Biological process	protein prenylation
Sources:Amigo / QuickGO
Orthologs
Databases	NCBI: entry; OMA: entry
Species	Human	Mouse
Entrez	375743	72351
Ensembl	ENSG00000188647	ENSMUSG00000074925
UniProt	Q7Z6K3	E9QAB6
RefSeq (mRNA)	NM_001099666	NM_028208
RefSeq (protein)	NP_001093136; NP_001353864; NP_001353865; NP_001353866; NP_001353867 NP_001353868; NP_001353869	NP_082484
Location (UCSC)	Chr 9: 69.71 – 69.76 Mb	Chr 19: 23.66 – 23.71 Mb
PubMed search
- Wikidata
View/Edit Human	View/Edit Mouse

PTAR1 is a protein that in humans is encoded by the PTAR1 gene. PTAR1 is a protein prenyltransferase and component of the geranylgeranyltransferase type III complex.
