= PGGT1B =

Protein-coding gene in the species Homo sapiens

Identifiers
- Aliases: PGGT1B, BGGI, GGTI, protein geranylgeranyltransferase type I subunit beta
- External IDs: OMIM: 602031; MGI: 1917514; GeneCards: PGGT1B
Enzyme activity
EC #	BRENDA	ExPASy	KEGG	MetaCyc
2.5.1.59	↗	↗	↗	↗

Gene location (Human)
Chr.	Chromosome 5 (human)
Band	5q22.3	Start	115,204,012 bp
Band	5q22.3	End	115,262,877 bp

Gene location (Mouse)
Chr.	Chromosome 18 (mouse)
Band	18|18 C	Start	46,368,418 bp
Band	18|18 C	End	46,414,060 bp
RNA expression pattern
Bgee	Human / Mouse (ortholog); Top expressed in: oocyte; secondary oocyte; monocyte; palpebral conjunctiva; mucosa of sigmoid colon; Achilles tendon; rectum; islet of Langerhans; amniotic fluid; epithelium of colon / Top expressed in: hand; otolith organ; utricle; pineal gland; renal corpuscle; prostate; lobe of prostate; otic vesicle; foot; lacrimal gland; More reference expression data
BioGPS	n/a
Gene ontology
Molecular function	prenyltransferase activity; zinc ion binding; protein geranylgeranyltransferase activity; metal ion binding; catalytic activity; isoprenoid binding; peptide binding; transferase activity; CAAX-protein geranylgeranyltransferase activity
Cellular component	CAAX-protein geranylgeranyltransferase complex
Biological process	negative regulation of nitric-oxide synthase biosynthetic process; positive regulation of cell cycle; positive regulation of cell population proliferation; response to cytokine; protein geranylgeranylation; protein prenylation
Sources:Amigo / QuickGO
Orthologs
Databases	NCBI: entry; OMA: entry
Species	Human	Mouse
Entrez	5229	225467
Ensembl	ENSG00000164219	ENSMUSG00000024477
UniProt	P53609	Q8BUY9
RefSeq (mRNA)	NM_005023	NM_172627
RefSeq (protein)	NP_005014	NP_766215
Location (UCSC)	Chr 5: 115.2 – 115.26 Mb	Chr 18: 46.37 – 46.41 Mb
PubMed search
- Wikidata
View/Edit Human	View/Edit Mouse

Protein geranylgeranyltransferase type I subunit beta is a protein that in humans is encoded by the PGGT1B gene.

== Function ==
Protein geranylgeranyltransferase type I (GGTase-I) transfers a geranylgeranyl group to the cysteine residue of candidate proteins containing a C-terminal CAAX motif in which 'A' is an aliphatic amino acid and 'X' is leucine (summarized by Zhang et al., 1994 [PubMed 8106351]). The enzyme is composed of a 48-kD alpha subunit (FNTA; MIM 134635) and a 43-kD beta subunit, encoded by the PGGT1B gene. The FNTA gene encodes the alpha subunit for both GGTase-I and the related enzyme farnesyltransferase.[supplied by OMIM, Mar 2010].
