= Dideoxyverticillin A =

Names
- Preferred IUPAC name (3S,3′S,5aR,5′aR,10bR,10′bR,11aS,11′aS)-2,2′,3,3′-Tetramethyl-2,2′,3,3′,5a,5′a,6,6′-octahydro-11H,11′H-[10b,10′b-bi-3,11a-disulfanopyrazino[1′,2′:1,5]pyrrolo[2,3-b]indole]-1,1′,4,4′-tetrone
- Other names 11,11′-Dideoxyverticillin A; 11,11′-Dideoxyverticillin

Identifiers
CAS Number	12795-76-5
3D model (JSmol)	Interactive image
ChEMBL	ChEMBL2172426
ChemSpider	10477789
PubChem CID	3084126
UNII	BDQ3M208XA
- InChI: InChI=1S/C30H28N6O4S4/c1-25-21(37)35-19-27(15-9-5-7-11-17(15)31-19,13-29(35,43-41-25)23(39)33(25)3)28-14-30-24(40)34(4)26(2,42-44-30)22(38)36(30)20(28)32-18-12-8-6-10-16(18)28/h5-12,19-20,31-32H,13-14H2,1-4H3/t19-,20-,25+,26+,27+,28+,29+,30+/m1/s1 Key: PVVLIIZIQXDFSP-PNVYSBBASA-N
- SMILES: C[C@]12C(=O)N3[C@@H]4[C@](C[C@@]3(C(=O)N1C)SS2)(C5=CC=CC=C5N4)[C@]67C[C@]89C(=O)N([C@](C(=O)N8[C@H]6NC1=CC=CC=C71)(SS9)C)C

Properties
Chemical formula	C_{30}H_{28}N_{6}O_{4}S_{4}
Molar mass	664.83 g·mol^{−1}
- Except where otherwise noted, data are given for materials in their standard state (at 25 °C [77 °F], 100 kPa). Infobox references

Dideoxyverticillin A, also known as (+)-11,11′-dideoxyverticillin A, is a complex epipolythiodioxopiperazine initially isolated from the marine fungus Penicillium sp. in 1999. It has also been found in the marine fungus Bionectriaceae, and belongs to a class of naturally occurring 2,5-diketopiperazines.

Dideoxyverticillin A potently inhibits the tyrosine kinase activity of the epidermal growth factor receptor (median inhibitory concentration = 0.14 nM), exhibits antiangiogenic activity, and has efficacy against several cancer cell lines. Its reported anticancer mechanism is that it acts as a farnesyl transferase inhibitor. Dozens of semi-synthetic anticancer compounds have been made from dideoxyverticillin A. Dimeric derivatives are reported to have better anticancer activity.

The enantioselective first total synthesis of (+)-11,11′-dideoxyverticillin A, the structure of which contains many sterically congested, contiguous stereogenic centers as well as acid- and base-labile and redox-sensitive functionality, was biosynthetically inspired and achieved with high levels of chemical sophistication.
