= Tipifarnib =

Chemical compound

Clinical data
- Other names: R115777
- ATC code: None

Legal status
- Legal status: Investigational

Identifiers
- IUPAC name: (+)-6-[(R)-Amino-(4-chlorophenyl)-(3-methylimidazol-4-yl)methyl]-4-(3-chlorophenyl)-1-methylquinolin-2-one
- CAS Number: 192185-72-1
- PubChem CID: 159324
- IUPHAR/BPS: 8025
- DrugBank: DB04960
- ChemSpider: 140122
- UNII: MAT637500A
- KEGG: D03720
- ChEBI: CHEBI:141969
- ChEMBL: ChEMBL289228
- CompTox Dashboard (EPA): DTXSID5041140

Chemical and physical data
- Formula: C_{27}H_{22}Cl_{2}N_{4}O
- Molar mass: 489.40 g·mol^{−1}
- 3D model (JSmol): Interactive image
- SMILES: CN1C(=O)C=C(c2cccc(Cl)c2)c3cc(ccc13)[C@](N)(c4ccc(Cl)cc4)c5cncn5C
- InChI: InChI=1S/C27H22Cl2N4O/c1-32-16-31-15-25(32)27(30,18-6-9-20(28)10-7-18)19-8-11-24-23(13-19)22(14-26(34)33(24)2)17-4-3-5-21(29)12-17/h3-16H,30H2,1-2H3/t27-/m1/s1; Key:PLHJCIYEEKOWNM-HHHXNRCGSA-N

Tipifarnib (INN, proposed trade name Zarnestra) is a farnesyltransferase inhibitor. Farnesyltransferase inhibitors block the activity of the farnesyltransferase enzyme by inhibiting prenylation of the CAAX tail motif, which ultimately prevents Ras from binding to the membrane, rendering it inactive.

== History ==
The compound was discovered by Johnson & Johnson Pharmaceutical Research & Development, L.L.C, with registration number R115777.

For treatment of progressive plexiform neurofibromas associated with neurofibromatosis type I, it passed phase I clinical trials but was suspended (NCT00029354) in phase II.

Tipifarnib was submitted to the FDA by Johnson & Johnson for the treatment of AML in patients aged 65 and over with a new drug application (NDA) to the FDA on January 24, 2005. In June 2005, the FDA issued a "not approvable" letter for tipifarnib.

Kura Oncology in-licensed tipifarnib from Janssen in 2014.

== Investigations ==
=== Cancer ===
The inhibitor is being investigated in patients with HRAS mutant head and neck cancer, peripheral T-cell lymphoma (PTCL), myelodysplastic syndromes (MDS), and chronic myelomonocytic leukemia (CMML). It was previously tested in clinical trials in patients in certain stages of breast cancer. It was also investigated as a treatment for multiple myeloma.

=== Progeria ===
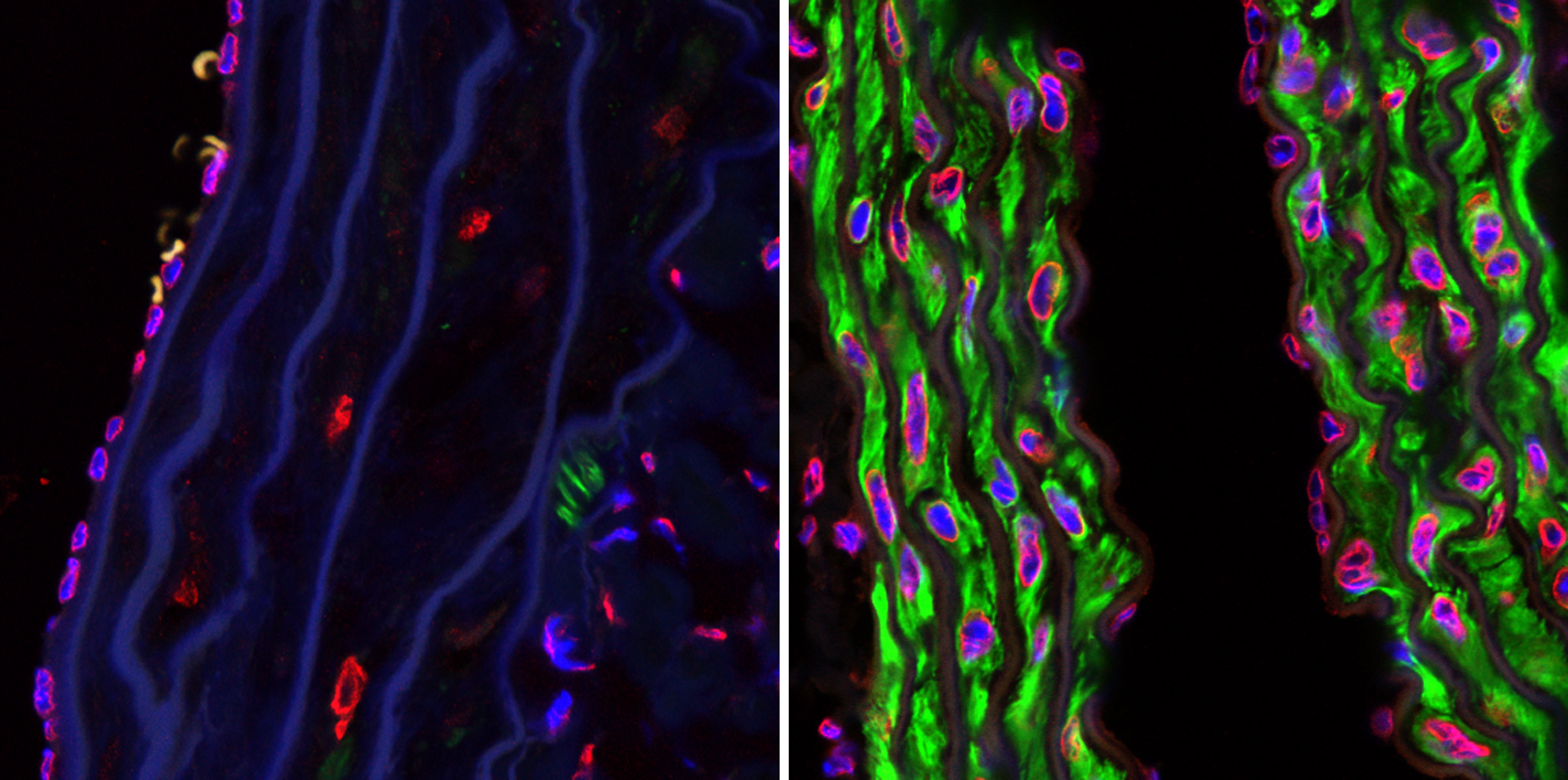
Confocal microscopy photographs of the descending aortas of two 15-month-old progeria mice, one untreated (left picture) and the other treated with the farnsyltransferase inhibitor drug tipifarnib (right picture). The microphotographs show prevention of the vascular smooth muscle cell loss that is otherwise rampant by this age. Staining was smooth muscle alpha-actin (green), lamins A/C (red) and DAPI (blue). (Original magnification, ×40)

It was shown on a mouse model of Hutchinson–Gilford progeria syndrome that dose-dependent administration of tipifarnib can significantly prevent both the onset of the cardiovascular phenotype as well as the late progression of existing cardiovascular disease.
