= Geranylgeranylation =

Post-translational modification

Geranylgeranylation is a form of prenylation, which is a post-translational modification of proteins that involves the attachment of one or two 20-carbon lipophilic geranylgeranyl isoprenoid units from geranylgeranyl diphosphate to one or two cysteine residue(s) at the C-terminus of specific proteins. Prenylation (including geranylgeranylation) is thought to function, at least in part, as a membrane anchor for proteins.

The process of geranylgeranylation can be catalyzed by either geranylgeranyl transferase I (GGTase I) or Rab GGTase (also GGTase II). GGTase I catalyzes the addition of one geranylgeranyl group onto the C-terminal consensus sequence CAAL (somewhat similar to farnesyltransferase reactions), where C=cysteine, A=any aliphatic amino acid, and L=leucine. Rab GGTase adds a total of two geranylgeranyl groups onto two cysteine residues at the C-terminal consensus sequence CXC or XXCC. The source of the geranylgeranyl group is geranylgeranyl diphosphate, which is synthesized by GGPS1 within the isoprenoid biosynthetic pathway.

An example of this can be seen in the lipid anchoring of the Rho GTPase family of signaling molecules and the gamma subunit of heterotrimeric G proteins.
