= FBXL2 =

Gene of the species Homo sapiens

Identifiers
- Aliases: FBXL2, FBL2, FBL3, F-box and leucine-rich repeat protein 2, F-box and leucine rich repeat protein 2
- External IDs: OMIM: 605652; MGI: 1919429; GeneCards: FBXL2

Gene location (Mouse)
Chr.	Chromosome 9 (mouse)
Band	9|9 F3	Start	113,792,705 bp
Band	9|9 F3	End	113,875,259 bp
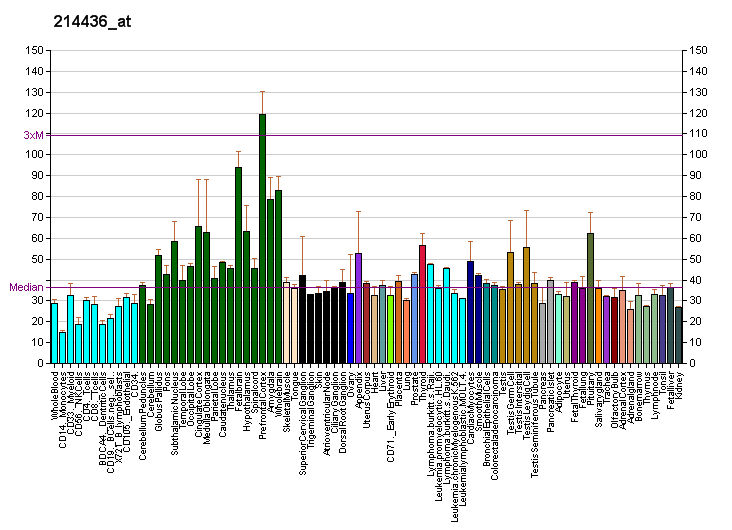
RNA expression pattern
Bgee	Human / Mouse (ortholog); n/a / Top expressed in: lumbar spinal ganglion; primary visual cortex; superior frontal gyrus; zygote; dentate gyrus of hippocampal formation granule cell; oocyte; primary oocyte; secondary oocyte; central gray substance of midbrain; right kidney
BioGPS	More reference expression data
Gene ontology
Molecular function	phosphatidylinositol 3-kinase regulatory subunit binding; protein phosphatase binding; protein binding; calmodulin binding; ubiquitin-protein transferase activity
Cellular component	cytoplasm; SCF ubiquitin ligase complex; membrane
Biological process	SCF-dependent proteasomal ubiquitin-dependent protein catabolic process; regulation of autophagy; viral process; protein monoubiquitination; protein ubiquitination; ubiquitin-dependent protein catabolic process; proteolysis; regulation of phosphatidylinositol 3-kinase signaling
Sources:Amigo / QuickGO
Orthologs
Databases	NCBI: entry; OMA: entry
Species	Human	Mouse
Entrez	25827	72179
Ensembl	ENSG00000153558	ENSMUSG00000032507
UniProt	Q9UKC9	Q8BH16
RefSeq (mRNA)	NM_001171713; NM_012157	NM_178624
RefSeq (protein)	NP_036289; NP_001336245; NP_001336248; NP_001336249; NP_001336250 NP_001336251; NP_001336252; NP_001336253; NP_001336254; NP_001336255	NP_848739
Location (UCSC)	n/a	Chr 9: 113.79 – 113.88 Mb
PubMed search
- Wikidata
View/Edit Human	View/Edit Mouse

F-box/LRR-repeat protein 2 is a protein that in humans is encoded by the FBXL2 gene.

This gene encodes a member of the F-box protein family which is characterized by an approximately 40 amino acid motif, the F-box. The F-box proteins constitute one of the four subunits of ubiquitin protein ligase complex called SCFs (SKP1-cullin-F-box), which function in phosphorylation-dependent ubiquitination. The F-box proteins are divided into 3 classes: Fbws containing WD-40 domains, Fbls containing leucine-rich repeats, and Fbxs containing either different protein-protein interaction modules or no recognizable motifs. The protein encoded by this gene belongs to the Fbls class and, in addition to an F-box, contains 12 tandem leucine-rich repeats.

FBXL2 is a highly conserved F-box protein that directly binds substrates and, thus, determines the specificity of the SCF ubiquitin ligase complex. FBXL2 contains a typical CaaX motif that is post-translationally modified by geranyl-geranylation for targeting to cellular membranes. The importance of the ubiquitin ligase activity of FBXL2 was originally shown in an unbiased screen for cellular host factors necessary for Hepatitis C virus replication. Geranyl-geranylation of FBXL2 is essential also for its pro-survival function in mediating poly-ubiquitylation and proteasomal degradation of IP3R3 (a calcium channel at the endoplasmic reticulum) and p85β (the regulatory subunit of PI3-Kinases).

PI3Ks are heterodimeric lipid kinases composed of a p110 catalytic subunit and a p85 regulatory subunit. FBXL2 interacts with the pool of p85β that is free of p110 subunits to promote p85β, but not p85α, degradation. The degradation of p85β via FBXL2 maintains the balance between p85β monomers and p110-p85 heterodimers for efficient activation of PI3K in response to mitogens.

In response to IP3 (inositol 1,4,5-trisphosphate) production, calcium (Ca^{2+}) flux between the endoplasmic reticulum and mitochondria is carried out by IP3 receptors (IP3Rs). This event is critical for cellular bioenergetics. The duration and the extent of Ca^{2+} release from IP3Rs determine whether cells survive or die: basal levels of Ca^{2+} release and uptake by the mitochondria is necessary for oxidative phosphorylation and ATP production. However, excessive and/or persistent Ca^{2+} flux results in mitochondrial Ca^{2+} overload and apoptosis. FBXL2 targets IP3R3 for degradation to avoid an excessive and prolonged flux of Ca^{2+} and to attenuate apoptosis in response to stress. This process requires presence of FBXL2 at membranes via geranylgeranylation, and is sensitive to GGTi-2418 (a CaaX peptidomimetic geranylgeranylation inhibitor that reached clinical trials). The degradation of IP3R3 is antagonized by the tumor suppressor PTEN, which competes with FBXL2 for binding to IP3R3, thereby preventing IP3R3 degradation and promoting cell death. FBXL2 is geranylgeranylated by GGTase3, a fourth and novel member of the human family of prenyltransferases, identified by the Pagano laboratory.
