= Farnesyltransferase inhibitor =

Class of experimental cancer drugs

Skeletal formula of tipifarnib (R115777), a farnesyltransferase inhibitor that reached Phase III clinical trials

The farnesyltransferase inhibitors (FTIs) are a class of experimental cancer drugs that target protein farnesyltransferase with the downstream effect of preventing the proper functioning of the Ras (protein), which is commonly abnormally active in cancer.

== Background ==
Studies have suggested that interference with certain post-translational modification processes seem to have quite a high selectivity for targeting cells displaying tumour phenotypes, although the reason for this is a matter of controversy.

After translation, Ras goes through four steps of modification: isoprenylation, proteolysis, methylation and palmitoylation. Isoprenylation involves the enzyme farnesyltransferase (FTase) transferring a farnesyl group from farnesyl pyrophosphate (FPP) to the pre-Ras protein. Also, a related enzyme geranylgeranyltransferase I (GGTase I) has the ability to transfer a geranylgeranyl group to K and N-Ras (the implications of this are discussed below). Farnesyl is necessary to attach Ras to the cell membrane. Without attachment to the cell membrane, Ras is not able to transfer signals from membrane receptors.

== Development ==
After a program of high-throughput screening of a class of drugs targeting the first step, the farnesyltransferase inhibitors (FTIs) were developed. One FTI found in the screening was clavaric acid, a mushroom isolate. A number of molecules were found to have FTI activity. Some earlier compounds were found to have major side effects, and their development was discontinued. The others have entered clinical trials for different cancers. SCH66336 (Lonafarnib) was the first to do so, followed by R115777 (Zarnestra, Tipifarnib).

Unfortunately, the predicted "early potential [of FTIs] has not been realised". The anti-tumour properties of FTIs were attributed to their action on Ras processing; however this assumption has now been questioned. Of the three members (H, N and K) of the Ras family, K-Ras is the form found most often mutated in cancer. As noted above, as well as modification by FFTase an alternative route to creation of biologically active Ras is through GGTase modification. When FFTase is blocked by FFTase inhibitors this pathway comes into operation – both K and N-Ras are able to be activated through this mechanism. In recognition of this a joint administration of FTIs and GTIs was tried, however this resulted in high toxicity. It is in fact thought that the lack of FTI toxicity may be due to a failure to fully inhibit Ras: FTIs actually target normal cells but alternative pathway allow these cells to survive (Downward J, 2003).

== Explaining success ==
It has been suggested that the preclinical successes showing that many N- or K-Ras transformed cell lines (and even tumor cell lines that do not harbor Ras mutations) are sensitive to FTase inhibitors due to inhibition of farnesylation of a number of other proteins. Therefore, it is hoped that FTIs, whilst not Ras specific, still have potential for cancer therapy.

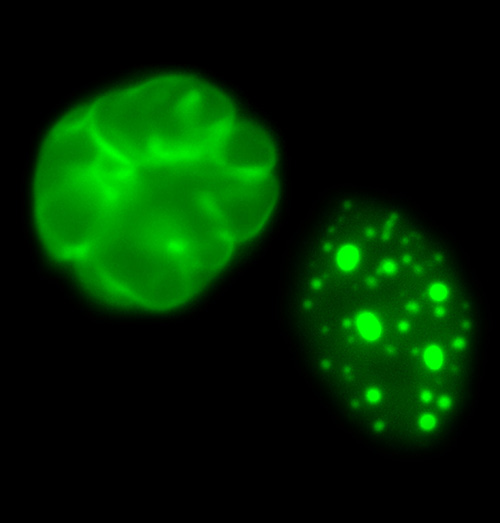
Untreated cells from children with the genetic disease progeria (left) compared to similar cells treated with farnesyltransferase inhibitors (FTIs). In vitro, FTIs reverse the nuclear damage caused by the disease.

== Investigation for alternative uses ==
=== Alzheimer's disease ===
LNK-754 inhibits the activity of a protein called farnesyl-transferase (FT). This class of molecules are called FTIs (or farnesyl-transferase inhibitors). As with mTOR inhibitors, many companies developed them to treat cancers, where they were unsuccessful. The mechanism by which FTIs work is through inhibition of this enzyme, which adds a fatty acid molecule to proteins (such as the oncogene, or cancer-generating, ras). Many proteins can exist in a cell in various locations, and the addition of a farnesyl group targets proteins to the plasma membrane. When ras gets to the plasma membrane, it becomes activated, and leads to tumour formation if this process is not stopped. It was thought that by inhibiting FT, ras will not be activated, therefore preventing cancer growth. The problem was that ras can also be modified by other mechanisms, and thus FTIs were not sufficient to inhibit malignant growth induced by ras signaling.

Most FTIs also have side effects (since they also indirectly affect mTOR), and their development for HD would likely not be successful. However, the remarkable finding is that Link Medicine has developed an FTI which does NOT affect mTOR signaling. This is a novel and important molecule, and might have higher probability to be of use for long term chronic diseases such as HD.

However, as with any new approach, further clinical trials are needed to determine its safety and efficacy in humans. Researchers note that evaluating this mechanism in humans will depend on whether autophagy mechanisms in human align with those observed in mice. If initial trials demonstrate safety, the lead molecule can progress to clinical testing in HD subjects.

=== Protozoan parasites ===
FTIs can also be used to inhibit farnesylation in parasites such as Trypanosoma brucei (African sleeping sickness) and Plasmodium falciparum (malaria). These parasites seem to be more vulnerable to inhibition of Farnesyltransferase than humans, even though the drugs tested selectively target human FTase. In some cases the reason for this may be the parasites lack Geranylgeranyltransferase I. This vulnerability may pave the way for the development of selective, low toxicity, FTI based anti-parasitic drugs 'piggybacking' on the development of FTIs for cancer research.

=== Use in progeria ===
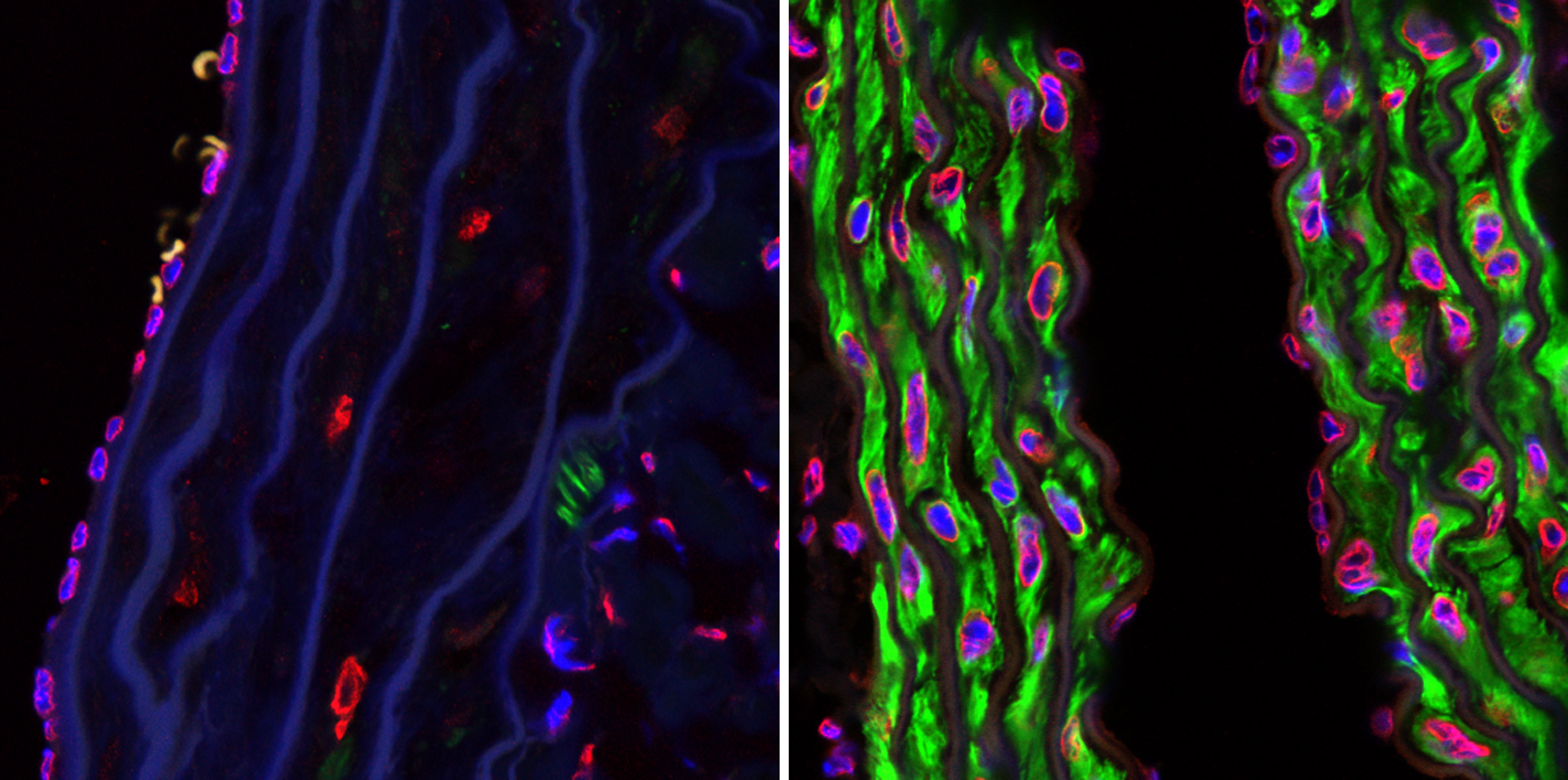
Confocal microscopy photographs of the descending aortas of two 15-month-old progeria mice, one untreated (left picture) and the other treated with the farnsyltransferase inhibitor drug tipifarnib (right picture). The microphotographs show prevention of the vascular smooth muscle cell loss that is otherwise rampant by this age. Staining was smooth muscle alpha-actin (green), lamins A/C (red) and DAPI (blue). (Original magnification, x 40)

Studies have been published indicating that farnesyltransferase inhibitors such as lonafarnib a synthetic tricyclic derivative of carboxamide with antineoplastic properties can reverse instability of nuclear structure due to the genetic mutation of the LMNA gene. The drug has been used to treat children suffering from Hutchinson–Gilford progeria syndrome. Results of the first-ever clinical drug trial for children with progeria, demonstrated the efficacy of a farnesyltransferase inhibitor (FTI).

== List of farnesyltransferase inhibitors ==
Name	Code	Description	CAS number
Chaetomellic acid A	sc-221420	Chaetomellic acid A is a potent inhibitor of farnesyltransferase in isolated enzyme assays (IC50 = 55nM) but it is inactive in whole cells.	148796-51-4
Clavaric acid			
FPT Inhibitor I	sc-221625	FPT Inhibitor I is a highly selective and potent inhibitor of farnesyltransferase. FPT Inhibitor I exhibits inhibition of GGTase I and II at much higher concentrations.	
FPT Inhibitor II	sc-221626	FPT Inhibitor II is a potent, selective farnesyltransferase and Ras farnesylation inhibitor in whole cells.	
FPT Inhibitor III	sc-221627	FPT Inhibitor III is a cell-permeable farnesyltransferase inhibitor and prevents Ras processing in cells.	
FTase Inhibitor I	sc-221632	FTase Inhibitor I is a potent, cell-permeable, selective, peptidomimetic inhibitor of farnesyltransferase (FTase).	149759-96-6
FTase Inhibitor II	sc-221633	FTase Inhibitor II is a potent farnesyltransferase inhibitor that has been shown to prevent Ras activity.	156707-43-6
FTI-276 trifluoroacetate salt	sc-215057	A highly potent RasCAAX peptidomimetic which antagonizes both H and K-Ras oncogenic signaling. This compound inhibits farnesyltransferase (Ftase) in vitro with an IC50 of 500 pM. Used as an anti-cancer agent.	170006-72-1 (non-salt)
FTI-277 trifluoroacetate salt	sc-215058	FTI-277 trifluoroacetate salt is an inhibitor of farnesyltransferase that displays antagonistic activity towards both H- and K-Ras oncogenic signaling.	170006-73-2 (free base)
GGTI-297	sc-221672	GGTI-297 is a potent, cell-permeable, and selective peptidomimetic inhibitor of GGTase I compared to farnesyltransferase (FTase).	
L-744,832 Dihydrochloride	sc-221800	L-744,832 Dihydrochloride is a Ras farnesyltransferase and p70 S6 kinase inhibitor. L-744,832 Dihydrochloride has been shown to induce tumor regression and apoptosis.	1177806-11-9 (free acid)
Lonafarnib	SCH66336		193275-84-2
Manumycin A	sc-200857	Manumycin A is an antibiotic generated by Streptomyces parvulus that acts as a selective and vigorous inhibitor of Ras farnesyltransferase and IKKβ.	52665-74-4
Tipifarnib	sc-364637	Tipifarnib has been shown to inhibit farnesyltransferase and therefore the kappa B-Ras peptide. Tipifarnib has also been shown to increase apoptosis in certain cancerous cell lines.	192185-72-1
Gingerol		Gingerol shown to activate SERCA (cardiac and skeletal SR Ca^{2+}-ATPase) with apoptosis inducing, anti-inflammatory, and antioxidant characteristics.	23513-14-6
Gliotoxin	sc-201299	Gliotoxin is a toxic epipolythiodioxopiperazine metabolite shown to be an immunosuppressive mycotoxin. Displays a capacity to induce apoptosis and inhibit NF-κB activation.	67-99-2
α-hydroxy Farnesyl Phosphonic Acid	sc-205200	α-hydroxy Farnesyl Phosphonic Acid is a competitive inhibitor of farnesyltransferase and blocks Ras processing.	148796-53-6

=== Products in development ===
- Tipifarnib
- Lonafarnib
