= Clavaric acid =

Names
- Other names 24, 25-Dihydroxy-2-(3-hydroxy-3-methylglutaryl)lanostan-3-one

Identifiers
3D model (JSmol)	Interactive image
ChEBI	CHEBI:219348
ChEMBL	ChEMBL452658
ChemSpider	5293553
PubChem CID	6918349
CompTox Dashboard (EPA)	DTXSID001045451
- InChI: InChI=1S/C36H58O8/c1-21(10-13-27(37)32(4,5)42)22-14-16-36(9)24-11-12-26-31(2,3)30(41)25(44-29(40)20-33(6,43)19-28(38)39)18-34(26,7)23(24)15-17-35(22,36)8/h21-22,25-27,37,42-43H,10-20H2,1-9H3,(H,38,39)/t21-,22-,25-,26+,27?,33?,34-,35-,36+/m1/s1 Key: FNHDSKHVYPYDAZ-VCICWZRISA-N
- SMILES: C[C@H](CCC(C(C)(C)O)O)[C@H]1CC[C@@]2([C@@]1(CCC3=C2CC[C@@H]4[C@@]3(C[C@H](C(=O)C4(C)C)OC(=O)CC(C)(CC(=O)O)O)C)C)C

Properties
Chemical formula	C_{36}H_{58}O_{8}
Molar mass	618.852 g·mol^{−1}
- Except where otherwise noted, data are given for materials in their standard state (at 25 °C [77 °F], 100 kPa). Infobox references

Clavaric acid is a lanostane type steroid produced by the mushroom Hypholoma lateritium. Clavaric acid was discovered by Merck Research Laboratories in a random screening of natural extracts. Clavaric acid is a reversible farnesyltransferase inhibitor with an IC_{50} of 1.3 μM.
