= Protein geranylgeranyltransferase type I =

Class of enzymes

CAAX-protein geranylgeranyltransferase

Identifiers
- EC no.: 2.5.1.59

Databases
- IntEnz: IntEnz view
- BRENDA: BRENDA entry
- ExPASy: NiceZyme view
- KEGG: KEGG entry
- MetaCyc: metabolic pathway
- PRIAM: profile
- PDB structures: RCSB PDB PDBe PDBsum
- Gene Ontology: AmiGO / QuickGO
Search
- PMC: articles
- PubMed: articles
- NCBI: proteins

In enzymology, a protein geranylgeranyltransferase type I (EC 2.5.1.59) is an enzyme that catalyzes the chemical reaction

geranylgeranyl diphosphate + protein-cysteine $\rightleftharpoons$ S-geranylgeranyl-protein + diphosphate

Thus, the two substrates of this enzyme are geranylgeranyl diphosphate and protein-cysteine, whereas its two products are S-geranylgeranyl-protein and diphosphate.

This enzyme belongs to the family of transferases, specifically those transferring aryl or alkyl groups other than methyl groups. The systematic name of this enzyme class is geranylgeranyl-diphosphate:protein-cysteine geranyltransferase. Other names in common use include GGTase-I, and GGTaseI.

== Structural studies ==
As of late 2007, 17 structures have been solved for this class of enzymes, with PDB accession codes 1S63, 1S64, 1SA4, 1SA5, 1TNB, 1TNO, 1TNU, 1TNY, 1TNZ, 1X81, 2BED, 2F0Y, 2H6F, 2H6G, 2H6H, 2H6I, and 2IEJ.
