= Rab escort protein 1 =

Protein-coding gene in the species Homo sapiens

CHM

Identifiers
- Aliases: CHM, DXS540, GGTA, HSD-32, REP-1, TCD, Rab escort protein 1, CHM Rab escort protein
- External IDs: OMIM: 300390; MGI: 892979; GeneCards: CHM

Gene location (Human)
| Chr. | X chromosome (human) |
| Band | Xq21.2 | Start | 85,861,180 bp |
| Band | Xq21.2 | End | 86,047,561 bp |

Gene location (Mouse)
| Chr. | X chromosome (mouse) |
| Band | X|X E1 | Start | 111,950,290 bp |
| Band | X|X E1 | End | 112,095,214 bp |
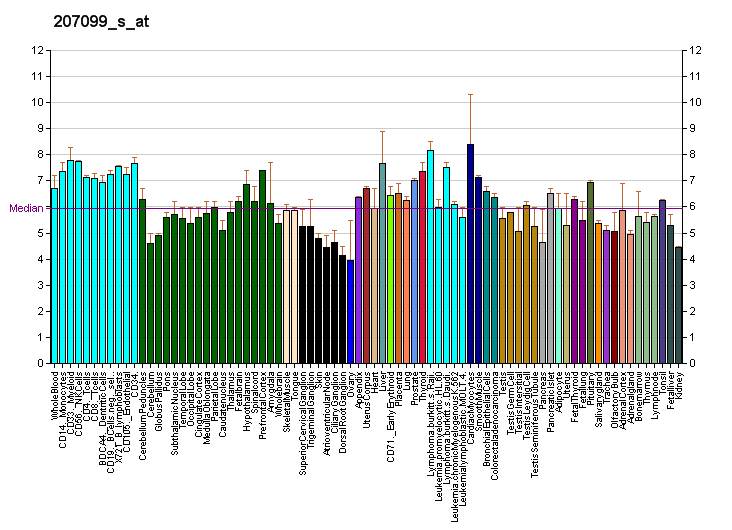
RNA expression pattern
| Bgee | Human / Mouse (ortholog); Top expressed in: endothelial cell; Brodmann area 23; middle temporal gyrus; germinal epithelium; visceral pleura; islet of Langerhans; postcentral gyrus; parietal pleura; Achilles tendon; lateral nuclear group of thalamus / Top expressed in: ciliary body; subdivision of hippocampus; Region I of hippocampus proper; retinal pigment epithelium; Epithelium of choroid plexus; iris; lateral geniculate nucleus; saccule; medial geniculate nucleus; medial dorsal nucleus; More reference expression data |
| BioGPS | More reference expression data |
Gene ontology
| Molecular function | Rab geranylgeranyltransferase activity; GTPase activator activity; GDP-dissociation inhibitor activity |
| Cellular component | cytoplasm; Rab-protein geranylgeranyltransferase complex; cytosol; nucleus |
| Biological process | positive regulation of GTPase activity; intracellular protein transport; protein geranylgeranylation; response to stimulus; visual perception; protein targeting to membrane; regulation of catalytic activity; small GTPase mediated signal transduction; regulation of apoptotic process; post-translational protein modification; vesicle-mediated transport |
Sources:Amigo / QuickGO
Orthologs
| Databases | NCBI: entry; OMA: entry |
| Species | Human | Mouse |
| Entrez | 1121 | 12662 |
| Ensembl | ENSG00000188419 | ENSMUSG00000025531 |
| UniProt | P24386 | Q9QXG2 |
| RefSeq (mRNA) | NM_000390; NM_001037312; NM_001145414; NM_001320959; NM_001362517 NM_001362518; NM_001362519; NM_152579 | NM_018818; NM_001370788; NM_001370789; NM_001370790 |
| RefSeq (protein) | NP_000381; NP_001138886; NP_001307888; NP_001349446; NP_001349447 NP_001349448 | n/a |
| Location (UCSC) | Chr X: 85.86 – 86.05 Mb | Chr X: 111.95 – 112.1 Mb |
| PubMed search |
- Wikidata
| View/Edit Human | View/Edit Mouse |

Rab escort protein 1 (REP1) also known as rab proteins geranylgeranyltransferase component A 1 is an enzyme that in humans is encoded by the CHM gene.

== Function ==
This gene encodes component A of the RAB geranylgeranyl transferase holoenzyme. In the dimeric holoenzyme, this subunit binds unprenylated Rab GTPases and then presents them to the catalytic Rab GGTase subunit for the geranylgeranyl transfer reaction. Rab GTPases need to be geranylgeranyled on either one or two cysteine residues in their C-terminus to localize to the correct intracellular membrane.

== Interactions ==
CHM (gene) has been shown to interact with RAB1A, RAB7A and RAB3A.

== Clinical significance ==
Mutations in this gene are a cause of choroideremia; also known as tapetochoroidal dystrophy (TCD). This X-linked disease is characterized by progressive dystrophy of the choroid, retinal pigment epithelium and retina.

== See also ==
- Rab (G-protein)
