= Rab geranylgeranyltransferase =

Class of enzyme complexes

Rab-protein geranylgeranyltransferase

Identifiers
- EC no.: 2.5.1.60

Databases
- BRENDA: enzyme data
- ExPASy: NiceZyme view
- KEGG: enzyme entry
- MetaCyc: metabolic pathway
- Rhea: reactions
- PDB structures: RCSB PDB PDBe PDBsum
- Gene Ontology: AmiGO / QuickGO
Search
- PMC: articles
- PubMed: articles
- NCBI: proteins

Rab geranylgeranyltransferase, alpha subunit
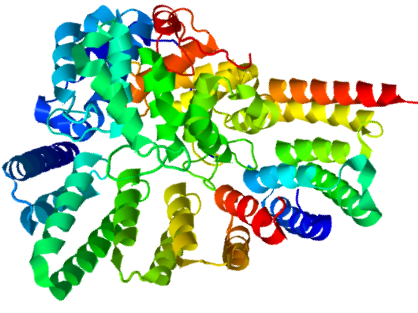
- Crystallographic structure of rat RabGGTase (rainbow colored, N-terminus = blue, C-terminus = red).

Identifiers
- Symbol: RABGGTA
- NCBI gene: 5875
- HGNC: 9795
- OMIM: 601905
- RefSeq: NM_004581
- UniProt: Q92696

Other data
- EC number: 2.5.1.60
- Locus: Chr. 14 q11.2
Search for
- Structures: Swiss-model
- Domains: InterPro

Rab geranylgeranyltransferase, beta subunit

Identifiers
- Symbol: RABGGTB
- NCBI gene: 5876
- HGNC: 9796
- OMIM: 179080
- RefSeq: NM_004582
- UniProt: P53611

Other data
- EC number: 2.5.1.60
- Locus: Chr. 1 p31
Search for
- Structures: Swiss-model
- Domains: InterPro

Rab geranylgeranyltransferase also known as (protein) geranylgeranyltransferase II is one of the three prenyltransferases. It transfers (usually) two geranylgeranyl groups to the cystein(s) at the C-terminus of Rab proteins.

geranylgeranyl diphosphate + protein-cysteine $\rightleftharpoons$ S-geranylgeranyl-Cys-protein + diphosphate

The C-terminus of Rab proteins varies in length and sequence and is referred to as hypervariable. Thus Rab proteins do not have a consensus sequence, such as the CAAX box, which the Rab geranylgeranyltransferase can recognise. Instead Rab proteins are bound by the Rab escort protein (REP) over a more conserved region of the Rab protein and then presented to the Rab geranylgeranyltransferase.

Once Rab proteins are prenylated, the lipid anchor(s) ensure that Rabs are no longer soluble. REP therefore plays an important role in binding and solubilising the geranylgeranyl groups and delivers the Rab protein to the relevant cell membrane.

== Reaction ==
Rab geranylgeranyltransferase (RabGGTase; enzyme commission code EC 2.5.1.60) is classified as a transferase enzyme; specifically, it is in the protein prenyltransferase family along with two other enzymes (protein farnesyltransferase and protein geranylgeranyltransferase type-I). The reaction catalyzed by RabGGTase is summarized as follows:

- geranylgeranyl diphosphate + protein-cysteine = S-geranylgeranyl-protein + diphosphate

This reaction is essential in the control of membrane docking and fusion. Studies of mice have shown that Rab GGTase genes are expressed in all major adult organs, as well as in some embryonic units, including the spinal cord and liver (Chinpaisal).

Rab geranylgeranyltransferase’s “outsourcing” of specificity (using REP to interact with the Rab proteins it prenylates, as mentioned above) is unique among prenyltransferases. Rab GGTase is “responsible for the largest number of individual protein prenylation events in the cell,” probably due to this ability to interact with many different Rab proteins (it can prenylate any sequence containing a cysteine residue).

In vitro studies have shown that Rab GGTase can be inhibited by nitrogen-containing bisphosphonate drugs such as risedronate; however, the effects of such drugs seem to be much more limited in vivo (Coxon).

== Structure ==
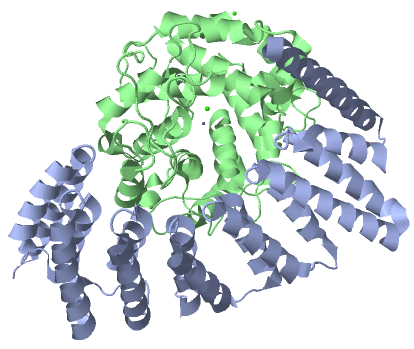
Crystallographic structure of rat RabGGTase (alpha subunit = green, beta subunit = slate blue, calcium ions are shown as green balls, zinc ion as a blue ball).

RabGGTase is a heterodimer composed of alpha and beta subunits that are encoded by the RABGGTA and RABGGTB genes, respectively. The structure of rat RabGGTase has been determined by X-ray diffraction (see image to the left) to a resolution of 1.80 Å. RabGGTase’s secondary structure is largely composed of alpha helices; the alpha subunit is 74% helical with no beta sheets, while the beta subunit is 51% helical and 5% beta sheet. There are 28 alpha helices total (15 in the alpha subunit and 13 in the beta subunit) and 15 very short (no more than 4 residues) beta sheets. Functional RabGGTase binds three metal ions as ligands: two calcium ions (Ca^{2+}) and a zinc ion (Zn^{2+}), all of which interact with the beta subunit.

== See also ==
- Farnesyltransferase
- Geranylgeranyltransferase type 1 – also referred to as Geranylgeranyltranferase 1 or just Geranylgeranyltranferase
- Prenylation
