= Farnesyltransferase =

Enzyme in the prenyltransferase group

Protein farnesyltransferase

Identifiers
- EC no.: 2.5.1.58
- CAS no.: 131384-38-8

Databases
- BRENDA: enzyme data
- ExPASy: NiceZyme view
- KEGG: enzyme entry
- MetaCyc: metabolic pathway
- Rhea: reactions
- PDB structures: RCSB PDB PDBe PDBsum
- Gene Ontology: AmiGO / QuickGO
Search
- PMC: articles
- PubMed: articles
- NCBI: proteins

Farnesyltransferase (EC 2.5.1.58) is one of the three enzymes in the prenyltransferase group. Farnesyltransferase (FTase) adds a 15-carbon isoprenoid called a farnesyl group to proteins bearing a CaaX motif: a four-amino acid sequence at the carboxyl terminus of a protein. Farnesyltransferase's targets include members of the Ras superfamily of small GTP-binding proteins critical to cell cycle progression. For this reason, several FTase inhibitors are undergoing testing as anti-cancer agents. FTase inhibitors have shown efficacy as anti-parasitic agents, as well. FTase is also believed to play an important role in development of progeria and various forms of cancers.

Farnesyltransferase catalyzes the chemical reaction

farnesyl diphosphate + protein-cysteine $\rightleftharpoons$ S-farnesyl protein + diphosphate

Thus, the two substrates of this enzyme are farnesyl diphosphate and protein-cysteine, whereas its two products are S-farnesyl protein and diphosphate.

== Overview ==
Farnesyltransferase posttranslationally-modifies proteins by adding an isoprenoid lipid called a farnesyl group to the -SH of the cysteine near the end of target proteins to form a thioether linkage. This process, called farnesylation (which is a type of prenylation), causes farnesylated proteins to become membrane-associated due to the hydrophobic nature of the farnesyl group. Most farnesylated proteins are involved in cellular signaling wherein membrane association is critical for function.

== Farnesyltransferase structure and function ==
Farnesyltransferase has two subunits: a 48kDa alpha subunit and a 46kDa beta subunit. Both subunits are primarily composed of alpha helices. The α subunit is made of a double layer of paired alpha helices stacked in parallel, which wraps partly around the beta subunit like a blanket. The alpha helices of the β subunit form a barrel. The active site is formed by the center of the β subunit flanked by part of the α subunit. Farnesyltransferase coordinates a zinc cation on its β subunit at the lip of the active site. Farnesyltransferase has a hydrophobic binding pocket for farnesyl diphosphate, the lipid donor molecule. All farnesyltransferase substrates have a cysteine as their fourth-to-last residue. This cysteine engages in an SN2 type attack, coordinated by the zinc and a transient stabilizing magnesium ion on the farnesyl diphosphate, displacing the diphosphate. The product remains bound to farnesyltransferase until displaced by new substrates. The last three amino acids of the CaaX motif are removed later.

=== Specificity ===
There are four binding pockets in FTase, which accommodate the last four amino acids on the carboxyl-terminus of a protein. Only those with a suitable CaaX motif can bind ('C' is Cysteine, 'a' is an aliphatic amino acid, and 'X' is variable). The carboxyl-terminal amino acid (X) discriminates FTase's targets from those of the other prenyltransferases, allowing only six different amino acids to bind with any affinity. It has been shown that geranylgeranyltransferase can prenylate some of the substrates of Farnesyltransferase and vice versa.

== Structural studies ==
As of late 2007, 15 structures have been solved for this class of enzymes, with PDB accession codes PDB: 1S63, PDB: 1S64, PDB: 1SA4, PDB: 1SA5, PDB: 1TN6, PDB: 1TN7, PDB: 1TN8, PDB: 1X81, PDB: 2BED, PDB: 2F0Y, PDB: 2H6F, PDB: 2H6G, PDB: 2H6H, PDB: 2H6I, and PDB: 2IEJ.

== See also ==
- Farnesyltransferase inhibitor
- Geranylgeranyltransferase type 1 – also referred to as geranylgeranyltranferase 1 or just geranylgeranyltranferase
- Prenylation
- Rab geranylgeranyltransferase – Geranylgeranyltransferase type 2
