= Prenylation =

Post-translational modification

Skeletal formula of the prenyl group.

Prenylation (also known as isoprenylation or lipidation) is the addition of hydrophobic molecules to a protein or other biomolecule. It is usually assumed that prenyl groups (3-methylbut-2-en-1-yl) facilitate attachment to cell membranes, similar to lipid anchors like the GPI anchor, though direct evidence of this has not been observed. Prenyl groups (also called isoprenyl groups, having one hydrogen atom more than isoprene) have been shown to be important for protein–protein binding through specialized prenyl-binding domains.

== Protein prenylation ==
Protein prenylation involves the transfer of either a farnesyl or a geranylgeranyl moiety to C-terminal cysteine(s) of the target protein. There are three enzymes that carry out prenylation in the cell, farnesyl transferase, Caax protease and geranylgeranyl transferase I.

Farnesylation is a type of prenylation, a post-translational modification of proteins by which an isoprenyl group is added to a cysteine residue. It is an important process to mediate protein–protein interactions and protein–membrane interactions.

=== Prenylation sites ===
There are at least three types of sites that are recognized by prenylation enzymes. The CaaX motif is found at the COOH-terminus of proteins, such as lamins or Ras. The motif consists of a cysteine (C), two aliphatic amino acids ("aa") and some other terminal amino acid ("X"). If the X position is serine, alanine, or methionine, the protein is farnesylated. For instance, in rhodopsin kinase the sequence is CVLS. If X is leucine, the protein is geranylgeranylated. The second motif for prenylation is CXC, which, in the Ras-related protein Rab3A, leads to geranylgeranylation on both cysteine residues and methyl esterification. The third motif, CC, is also found in Rab proteins, where it appears to direct only geranylgeranylation but not carboxyl methylation. Carboxyl methylation only occurs on prenylated proteins.

=== Farnesyltransferase and geranylgeranyltransferase I ===
Farnesyltransferase and geranylgeranyltransferase I are very similar proteins. They consist of two subunits, the α-subunit, which is common to both enzymes, and the β-subunit, whose sequence identity is just 25%. These enzymes recognise the CaaX box at the C-terminus of the target protein. C is the cysteine that is prenylated, a is any aliphatic amino acid, and the identity of X determines which enzyme acts on the protein. Farnesyltransferase recognizes CaaX boxes where X = M, S, Q, A, or C, whereas geranylgeranyltransferase I recognizes CaaX boxes with X = L or E.

=== Rab geranylgeranyl transferase ===
Rab geranylgeranyltransferase, or geranylgeranyltransferase II, transfers (usually) two geranylgeranyl groups to the cysteine(s) at the C-terminus of Rab proteins. The C-terminus of Rab proteins varies in length and sequence and is referred to as hypervariable. Thus Rab proteins do not have a consensus sequence, such as the CAAX box, which the Rab geranylgeranyl transferase can recognize. The Rab proteins usually terminate in a CC or CXC motif. Instead, Rab proteins are bound by the Rab escort protein (REP) over a more conserved region of the Rab protein and then presented to the Rab geranylgeranyltransferase. Once Rab proteins are prenylated, the lipid anchor(s) ensure that Rabs are no longer soluble. REP, therefore, plays an important role in binding and solubilising the geranylgeranyl groups and delivers the Rab protein to the relevant cell membrane.

=== Substrates ===
Both isoprenoid chains, geranylgeranyl pyrophosphate (GGpp) and farnesyl pyrophosphate are products of the HMG-CoA reductase pathway. The product of HMG CoA reductase is mevalonate. By combining precursors with 5 carbons, the pathway subsequently produces geranyl pyrophosphate (10 carbons), farnesyl pyrophosphate (15 carbons) and geranylgeranyl pyrophosphate (20 carbons). Two farnesyl pyrophosphate groups can also be combined to form squalene, the precursor for cholesterol. This means that statins, which inhibit HMG CoA reductase, inhibit the production of both cholesterol and isoprenoids.

Note that, in the HMG-CoA reductase/mevalonate pathway, the precursors already contain a pyrophosphate group, and isoprenoids are produced with a pyrophosphate group. There is no known enzyme activity that can carry out the prenylation reaction with the isoprenoid alcohol. However, enzymatic activity for isoprenoid kinases capable converting isoprenoid alcohols to isoprenoid pyrophosphates have been shown. In accordance with this, farnesol and geranylgeraniol have been shown to be able to rescue effects caused by statins or nitrogenous bisphosphonates, further supporting that alcohols can be involved in prenylation, likely via phosphorylation to the corresponding isoprenoid pyrophosphate.

Proteins that undergo prenylation include Ras, which plays a central role in the development of cancer. This suggests that inhibitors of prenylation enzymes (e.g., farnesyltransferase) may influence tumor growth. In the case of the K- and N-Ras forms of Ras, when cells are treated with FTIs, these forms of Ras can undergo alternate prenylation in the form of geranylgeranylation. Recent work has shown that farnesyltransferase inhibitors (FTIs) also inhibit Rab geranylgeranyltransferase and that the success of such inhibitors in clinical trials may be as much due to effects on Rab prenylation as on Ras prenylation. Inhibitors of prenyltransferase enzymes display different specificity for the prenyltransferases, dependent upon the specific compound being utilized.

In addition to GTPases, the protein kinase GRK1 also known as rhodopsin kinase (RK) has been shown to undergo farnesylation and carboxyl methylation directed by the carboxyl terminal CVLS CaaX box sequence of the protein. The functional consequence of these post-translational modifications have been shown to play a role in regulating the light-dependent phosphorylation of rhodopsin, a mechanism involved in light adaptation.

=== Inhibitors ===
FTIs can also be used to inhibit farnesylation in parasites such as Trypanosoma brucei and malaria. Parasites seem to be more vulnerable to inhibition of farnesyltransferase than humans are. In some cases, this may be because they lack geranylgeranyltransferase I. Thus, it may be possible for the development of antiparasitic drugs to 'piggyback' on the development of FTIs for cancer research.

In addition, FTIs have shown some promise in treating a mouse model of progeria, and in May 2007 a phase II clinical trial using the FTI lonafarnib was started for children with progeria.

In signal transduction via G protein, palmitoylation of the α subunit, prenylation of the γ subunit, and myristoylation is involved in tethering the G protein to the inner surface of the plasma membrane so that the G protein can interact with its receptor.

== Prenylation of small molecules ==
Small molecules can also undergo prenylation, such as in the case of prenylflavonoids and other meroterpenoids. Prenylation of a vitamin B_{2} derivative (flavin mononucleotide) was recently described.

== Longevity and cardiac effects ==
A 2012 study found that statin treatment increases lifespan and improves cardiac health in Drosophila by decreasing specific protein prenylation. The study concluded, "These data are the most direct evidence to date that decreased protein prenylation can increase cardiac health and lifespan in any metazoan species, and may explain the pleiotropic (non-cholesterol related) health effects of statins."

A 2012 clinical trial explored the approach of inhibiting protein prenylation with some degree of success in the treatment of Hutchinson–Gilford progeria syndrome, a multisystem disorder which causes failure to thrive and accelerated atherosclerosis leading to early death.

== See also ==
- Myristoylation
- Palmitoylation
- Choroideremia, a genetic disease caused by the loss of REP1, REP2 almost compensates, but cannot rescue the slow onset of blindness
