= FNTB =

Protein-coding gene in the species Homo sapiens

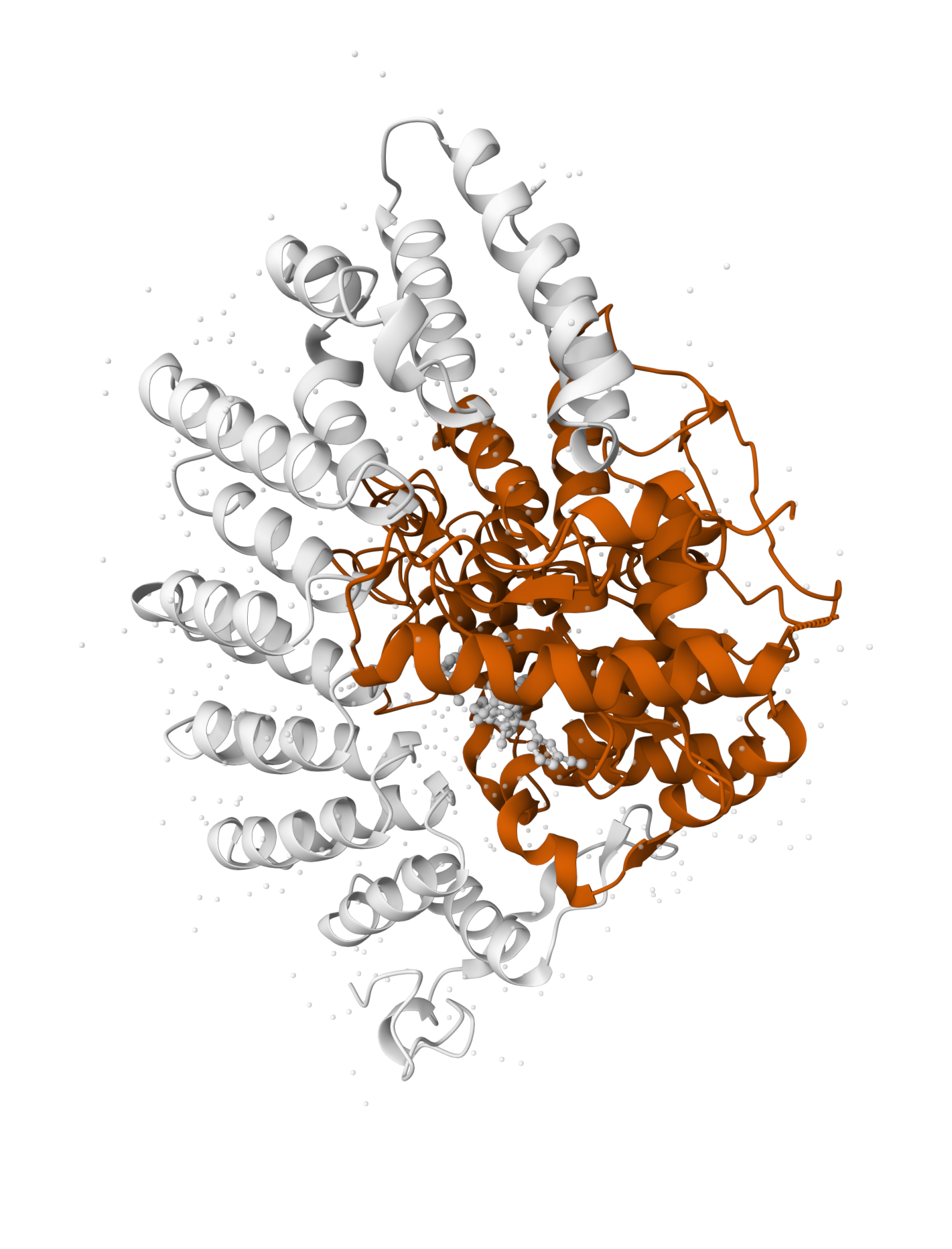

Identifiers
- Aliases: FNTB, FPTB, farnesyltransferase, CAAX box, beta
- External IDs: OMIM: 134636; MGI: 1861305; GeneCards: FNTB
Available structures
PDB	Ortholog search: PDBe RCSB
PDB	List of PDB id codes 1JCQ, 1LD7, 1LD8, 1MZC, 1S63, 1SA4, 1TN6, 2F0Y, 2H6F, 2H6G, 2H6H, 2H6I, 2IEJ, 3E37
Enzyme activity
EC #	BRENDA	ExPASy	KEGG	MetaCyc
2.5.1.58	↗	↗	↗	↗

Gene location (Mouse)
Chr.	Chromosome 12 (mouse)
Band	12 C3|12 33.73 cM	Start	76,812,363 bp
Band	12 C3|12 33.73 cM	End	76,968,186 bp
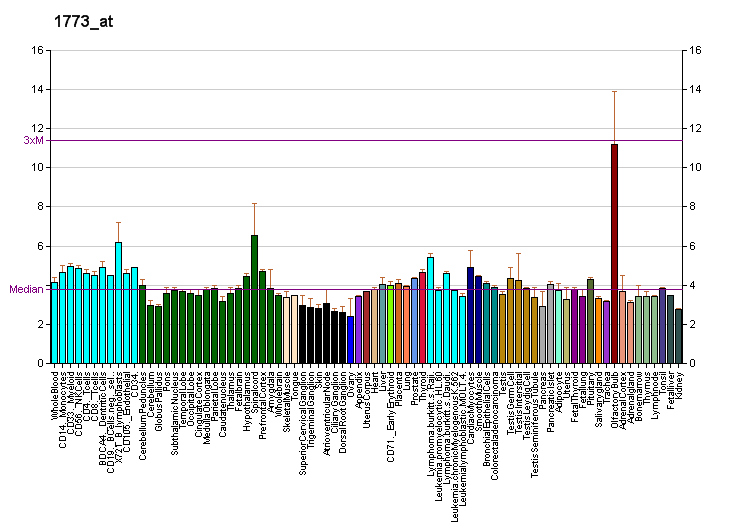

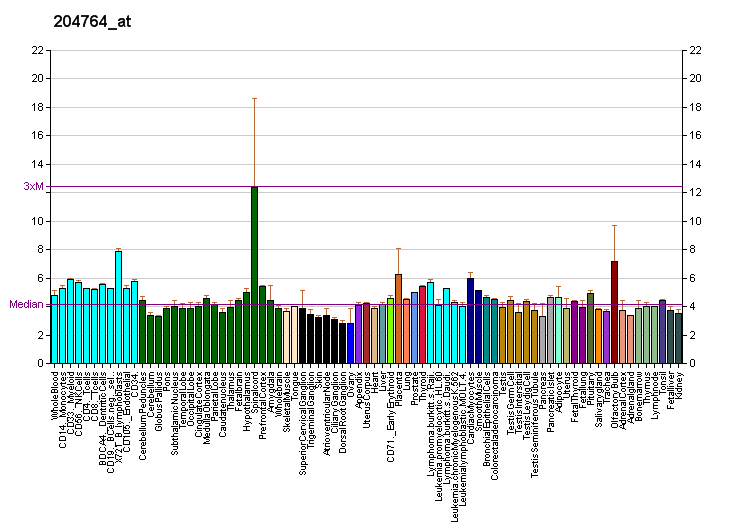
RNA expression pattern
Bgee	Human / Mouse (ortholog); Top expressed in: corpus callosum; substantia nigra; gastrocnemius muscle; tibial nerve; skin of abdomen; right uterine tube; sural nerve; pituitary gland; hippocampus proper; vagina / Top expressed in: yolk sac; lip; genital tubercle; neural layer of retina; tail of embryo; muscle of thigh; esophagus; neural tube; cerebellar cortex; epiblast; More reference expression data
BioGPS	More reference expression data
Gene ontology
Molecular function	metal ion binding; transferase activity; prenyltransferase activity; catalytic activity; protein farnesyltransferase activity; protein binding; farnesyltranstransferase activity; zinc ion binding; isoprenoid binding; peptide binding
Cellular component	cytosol; protein farnesyltransferase complex; microtubule associated complex; protein-containing complex
Biological process	protein farnesylation; positive regulation of cell population proliferation; negative regulation of cell population proliferation; response to inorganic substance; response to organic cyclic compound; response to cytokine; wound healing; positive regulation of cell cycle; positive regulation of fibroblast proliferation; positive regulation of nitric-oxide synthase biosynthetic process; protein prenylation; regulation of fibroblast proliferation; regulation of rhodopsin mediated signaling pathway
Sources:Amigo / QuickGO
Orthologs
Databases	NCBI: entry
Species	Human	Mouse
Entrez	2342	110606
Ensembl	n/a	ENSMUSG00000033373
UniProt	P49356	Q8K2I1
RefSeq (mRNA)	NM_002028	NM_145927
RefSeq (protein)	NP_002019; NP_001189487; NP_001189488	NP_666039
Location (UCSC)	n/a	Chr 12: 76.81 – 76.97 Mb
PubMed search
- Wikidata
View/Edit Human	View/Edit Mouse

Protein farnesyltransferase subunit beta is an enzyme that in humans is encoded by the FNTB gene.
