= Prenyltransferase =

Prenyltransferase and squalene oxidase repeat
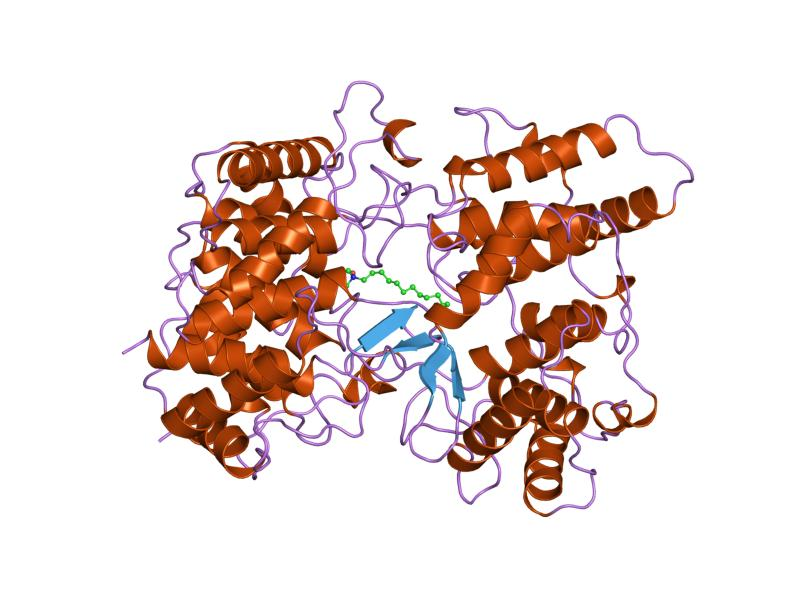
- Structure of a squalene cyclase.

Identifiers
- Symbol: Prenyltrans
- Pfam: PF00432
- Pfam clan: CL0059
- InterPro: IPR001330
- PROSITE: PDOC00825
- SCOP2: 1sqc / SCOPe / SUPFAM
- OPM superfamily: 37
- OPM protein: 1w6k
Available protein structures:
- PDB: IPR001330 PF00432 (ECOD; PDBsum)
- AlphaFold: IPR001330; PF00432

Prenyltransferases (PTs) are a class of enzymes that transfer allylic prenyl groups to acceptor molecules. Prenyl transferases commonly refer to isoprenyl diphosphate syntheses (IPPSs). Prenyltransferases are a functional category and include several enzyme groups that are evolutionarily independent.

Prenyltransferases are commonly divided into two classes, cis (or Z) and trans (or E), depending upon the stereochemistry of the resulting products. Examples of trans-prenyltranferases include dimethylallyltranstransferase, and geranylgeranyl pyrophosphate synthase. Cis-prenyltransferases include dehydrodolichol diphosphate synthase (involved in the production of a precursor to dolichol). Trans- and cis-prenyltransferases are evolutionarily unrelated to each other and there is no sequential and structural similarity.

The beta subunit of the farnesyltransferases is responsible for peptide binding. Squalene-hopene cyclase is a bacterial enzyme that catalyzes the cyclization of squalene into hopene, a key step in hopanoid (triterpenoid) metabolism. Lanosterol synthase (EC 5.4.99.7) (oxidosqualene-lanosterol cyclase) catalyzes the cyclization of (S)-2,3-epoxysqualene to lanosterol, the initial precursor of cholesterol, steroid hormones and vitamin D in vertebrates and of ergosterol in fungi. Cycloartenol synthase (EC 5.4.99.8) (2,3-epoxysqualene-cycloartenol cyclase) is a plant enzyme that catalyzes the cyclization of (S)-2,3-epoxysqualene to cycloartenol.

== Human proteins containing this domain ==
FNTB; LSS; PGGT1B; RABGGTB

== See also ==
- Cis–trans isomerism
- E–Z notation
