= Geranylgeranyltransferase type 1 =

Macromolecular complex found in Homo sapiens

protein geranylgeranyltransferase type I

Identifiers
- EC no.: 2.5.1.59
- CAS no.: 135371-29-8

Databases
- BRENDA: enzyme data
- ExPASy: NiceZyme view
- KEGG: enzyme entry
- MetaCyc: metabolic pathway
- Rhea: reactions
- PDB structures: RCSB PDB PDBe PDBsum
- Gene Ontology: AmiGO / QuickGO
Search
- PMC: articles
- PubMed: articles
- NCBI: proteins

GGTase 1 α-subunit (farnesyltransferase, CAAX box)

Identifiers
- Symbol: FNTA
- NCBI gene: 2339
- HGNC: 3782
- OMIM: 134635
- PDB: 1S64
- RefSeq: NM_002027
- UniProt: P49354

Other data
- EC number: 2.5.1.59
- Locus: Chr. 8 p11.21
Search for
- Structures: Swiss-model
- Domains: InterPro

GGTase 1 β-subunit (protein geranylgeranyl- transferase type I, β subunit)

Identifiers
- Symbol: PGGT1B
- NCBI gene: 5229
- HGNC: 8895
- OMIM: 602031
- PDB: 1S64
- RefSeq: NM_005023
- UniProt: P53609

Other data
- EC number: 2.5.1.59
- Locus: Chr. 5 q23.1
Search for
- Structures: Swiss-model
- Domains: InterPro

Geranylgeranyltransferase type 1 or simply geranylgeranyltransferase is one of the three enzymes in the prenyltransferase group. In specific terms, Geranylgeranyltransferase (GGTase 1) adds a 20-carbon isoprenoid called a geranylgeranyl group to proteins bearing a CaaX motif: a four-amino acid sequence at the carboxyl terminal of a protein. Geranylgeranyltransferase inhibitors are being investigated as anti-cancer agents.

== Function ==
Prenyltransferases, including geranylgeranyltransferase, posttranslationally modify proteins by adding an isoprenoid lipid called a prenyl group to the carboxyl terminus of the target protein. This process, called prenylation, causes prenylated proteins to become membrane-associated due to the hydrophobic nature of the prenyl group. Most prenylated proteins are involved in cellular signaling, wherein membrane association is critical for function.

== Structure ==
Geranylgeranyltransferase contains two subunits, α and β that are encoded by the FNTA and PGGT1B genes, respectively. Both subunits are composed primarily of alpha helices. Geranylgeranyltransferase coordinates a zinc cation on its β subunit at the lip of the active site. Geranylgeranyltransferase has a hydrophobic binding pocket for geranylgeranyl diphosphate, the lipid donor molecule. All Geranylgeranyltransferase substrates invariably have a cysteine as their fourth-to-last residue. This cysteine, coordinated by the zinc, engages in an SN2 type attack on the geranylgeranyl diphosphate, displacing the diphosphate.

== See also ==
- Farnesyltransferase
- Prenylation
- Rab geranylgeranyltransferase – Geranylgeranyltransferase type 2
