= FNTA =

Protein-coding gene in humans

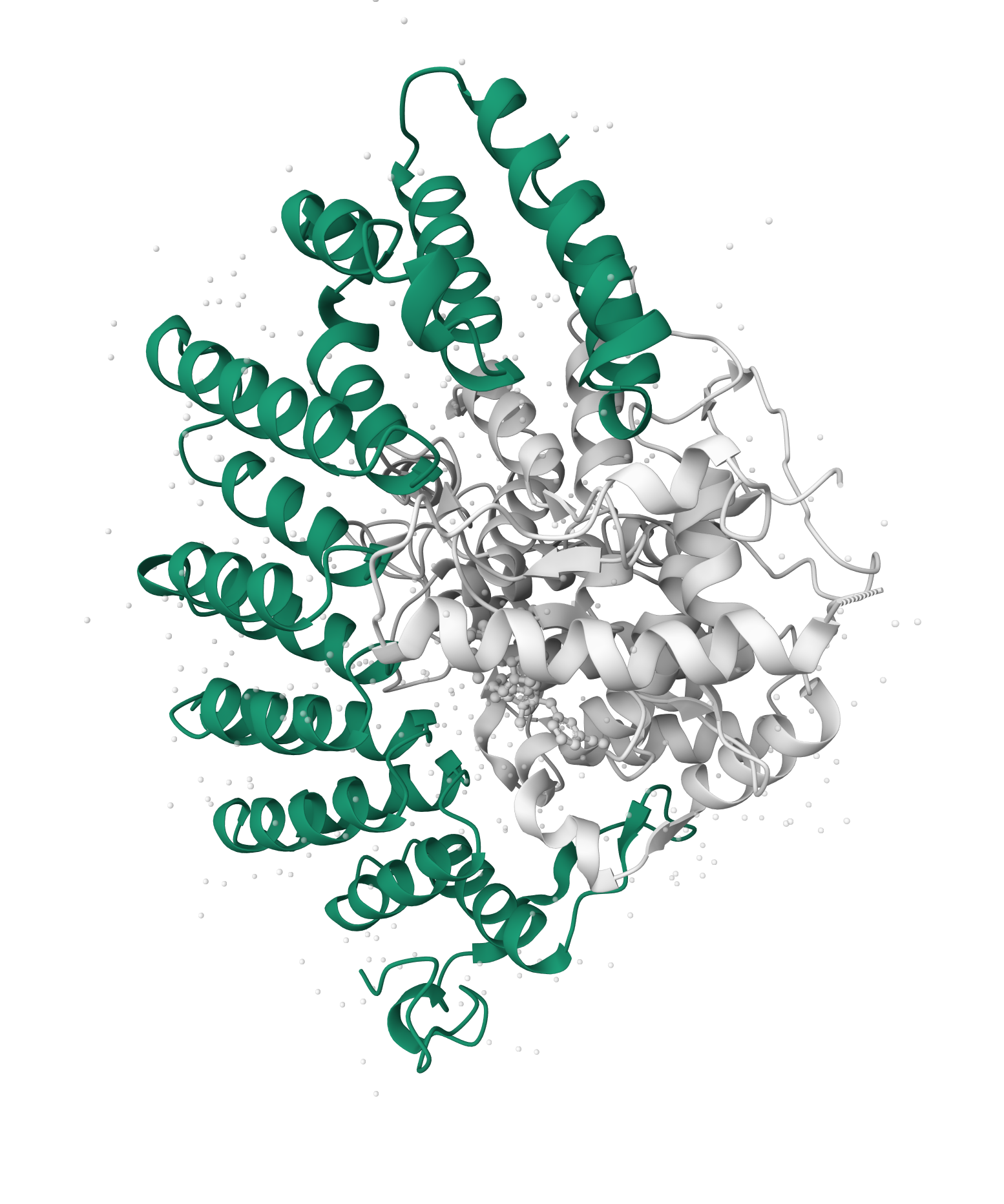

Identifiers
- Aliases: FNTA, FPTA, PGGT1A, PTAR2, farnesyltransferase, CAAX box, alpha
- External IDs: OMIM: 134635; MGI: 104683; GeneCards: FNTA
Available structures
PDB	Ortholog search: PDBe RCSB
PDB	List of PDB id codes 1JCQ, 1LD7, 1LD8, 1MZC, 1S63, 1SA4, 1TN6, 2F0Y, 2H6F, 2H6G, 2H6H, 2H6I, 2IEJ, 3E37
Enzyme activity
EC #	BRENDA	ExPASy	KEGG	MetaCyc
2.5.1.58	↗	↗	↗	↗
2.5.1.59	↗	↗	↗	↗

Gene location (Human)
Chr.	Chromosome 8 (human)
Band	8p11.21	Start	43,034,194 bp
Band	8p11.21	End	43,085,788 bp

Gene location (Mouse)
Chr.	Chromosome 8 (mouse)
Band	8 A2|8 14.27 cM	Start	26,488,750 bp
Band	8 A2|8 14.27 cM	End	26,505,678 bp
RNA expression pattern
Bgee	Human / Mouse (ortholog); Top expressed in: gingival epithelium; olfactory bulb; subthalamic nucleus; inferior ganglion of vagus nerve; pancreatic ductal cell; amniotic fluid; parotid gland; skin of hip; germinal epithelium; trigeminal ganglion / Top expressed in: medullary collecting duct; facial motor nucleus; fossa; Paneth cell; condyle; vestibular membrane of cochlear duct; renal corpuscle; substantia nigra; ciliary body; ureter; More reference expression data
BioGPS	n/a
Gene ontology
Molecular function	transferase activity; protein prenyltransferase activity; protein geranylgeranyltransferase activity; microtubule binding; Rab geranylgeranyltransferase activity; receptor tyrosine kinase binding; alpha-tubulin binding; protein farnesyltransferase activity; acetylcholine receptor regulator activity; protein binding; prenyltransferase activity; CAAX-protein geranylgeranyltransferase activity
Cellular component	cytoplasm; cytosol; protein farnesyltransferase complex; microtubule associated complex; CAAX-protein geranylgeranyltransferase complex; plasma membrane
Biological process	positive regulation of tubulin deacetylation; protein prenylation; protein geranylgeranylation; neuromuscular junction development; skeletal muscle acetylcholine-gated channel clustering; positive regulation of deacetylase activity; protein farnesylation; transforming growth factor beta receptor signaling pathway; neurotransmitter receptor metabolic process; regulation of neurotransmitter receptor activity; regulation of rhodopsin mediated signaling pathway
Sources:Amigo / QuickGO
Orthologs
Databases	NCBI: entry; OMA: entry
Species	Human	Mouse
Entrez	2339	14272
Ensembl	ENSG00000168522	ENSMUSG00000015994
UniProt	P49354	Q61239
RefSeq (mRNA)	NM_001018676; NM_001018677; NM_002027	NM_008033
RefSeq (protein)	NP_002018	NP_032059
Location (UCSC)	Chr 8: 43.03 – 43.09 Mb	Chr 8: 26.49 – 26.51 Mb
PubMed search
- Wikidata
View/Edit Human	View/Edit Mouse

Protein farnesyltransferase/geranylgeranyltransferase type-1 subunit alpha is an enzyme that in humans is encoded by the FNTA gene.

Prenyltransferases attach either a farnesyl group or a geranylgeranyl group in thioether linkage to the cysteine residue of protein's with a C-terminal CAAX box. CAAX geranylgeranyltransferase and CAAX farnesyltransferase are heterodimers that share the same alpha subunit but have different beta subunits. This gene encodes the alpha subunit of these transferases. Alternative splicing results in multiple transcript variants encoding different isoforms.

== Interactions ==
FNTA has been shown to interact with TGF beta receptor 1.
