= Culture of Rome =

Historic Centre of Rome, the Properties of the Holy See in that City Enjoying Extraterritorial rights and San Paolo Fuori le Mura
UNESCO World Heritage Site
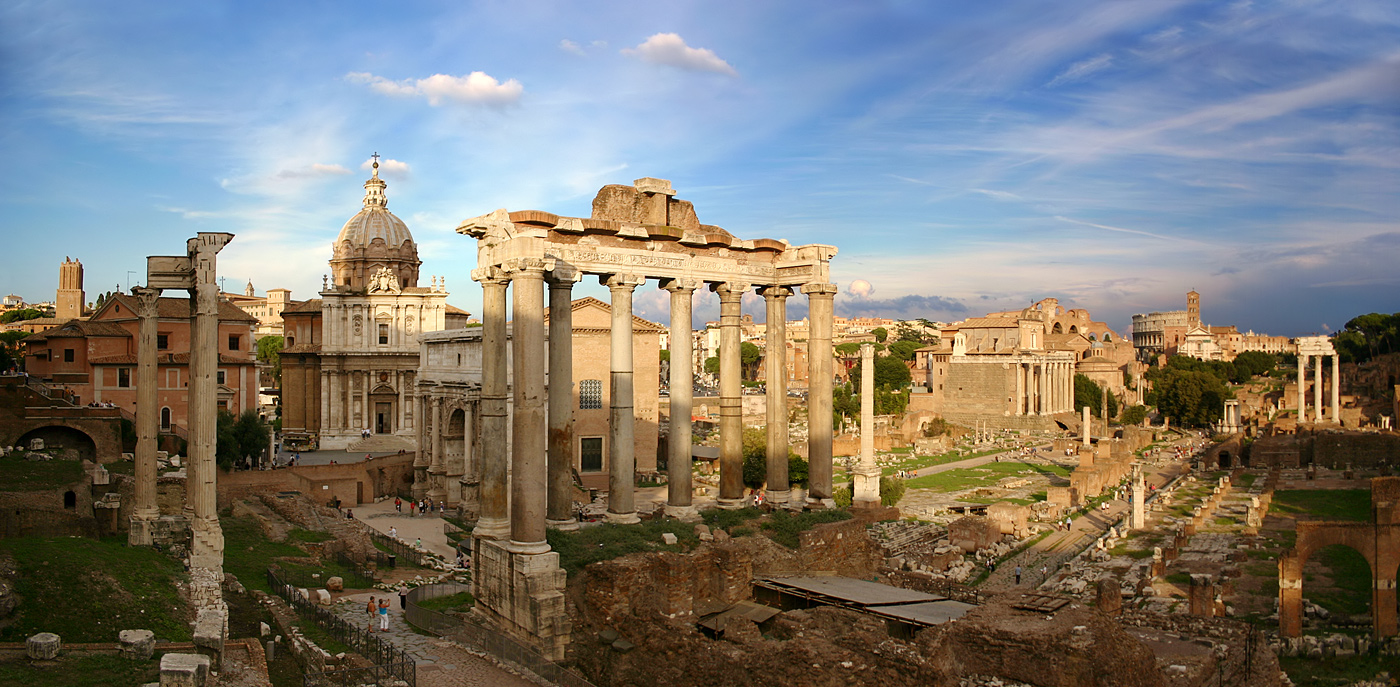
- Forum Romanum

- Location within Rome Location within Lazio Location within Italy
- Location: Rome, Holy See and Italy
- Criteria: Cultural: (i)(ii)(iii)(iv)(vi)
- Reference: 91ter
- Inscription: 1980 (4th Session)
- Extensions: 1990, 2015
- Area: 1,430.8 ha (3,536 acres)
- Coordinates: 41°53′24.8″N 12°29′32.3″E

The culture of Rome in Italy refers to the arts, high culture, language, religion, politics, libraries, cuisine, architecture and fashion in Rome, Italy. Rome was supposedly founded in 753 BC and ever since has been the capital of the Roman Empire, one of the main centres of Christianity, the home of the Roman Catholic Church and the seat of the Italian Republic. Due to its historical and social importance, Rome has been nicknamed the Caput Mundi, or "capital of the world".

== The arts ==
=== Architecture and city layout ===
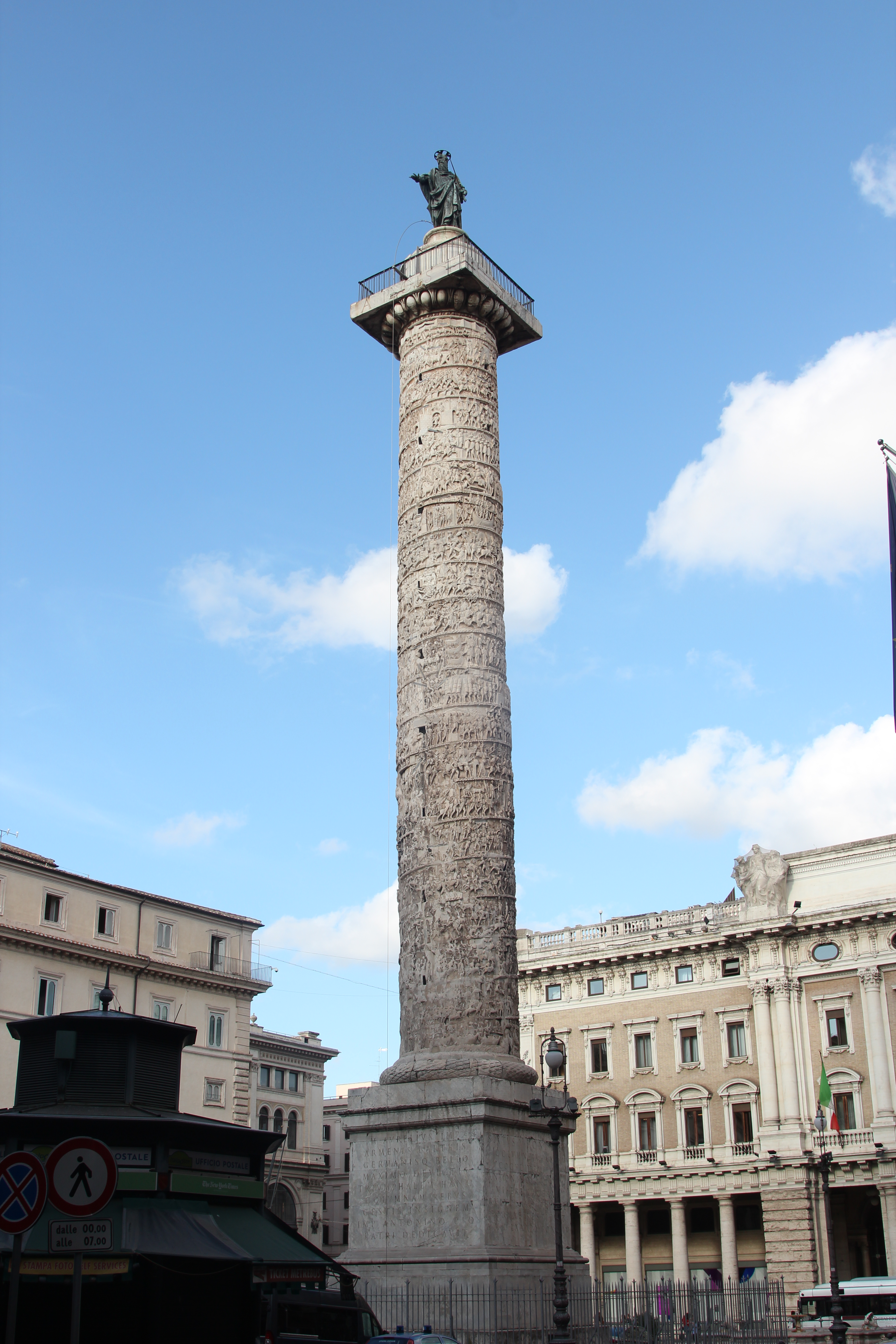
Column of Marcus Aurelius

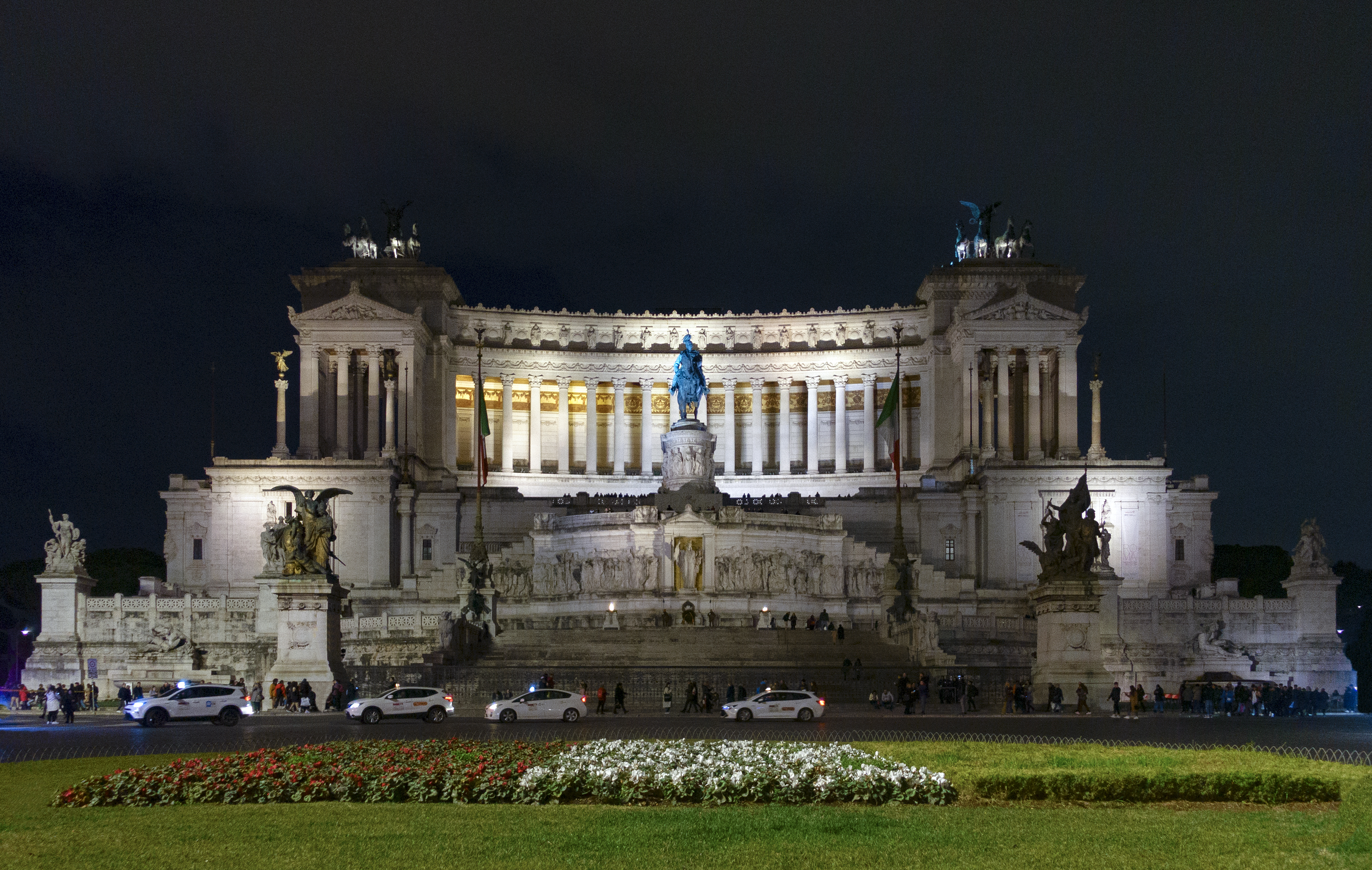
Monument to Vittorio Emanuele II

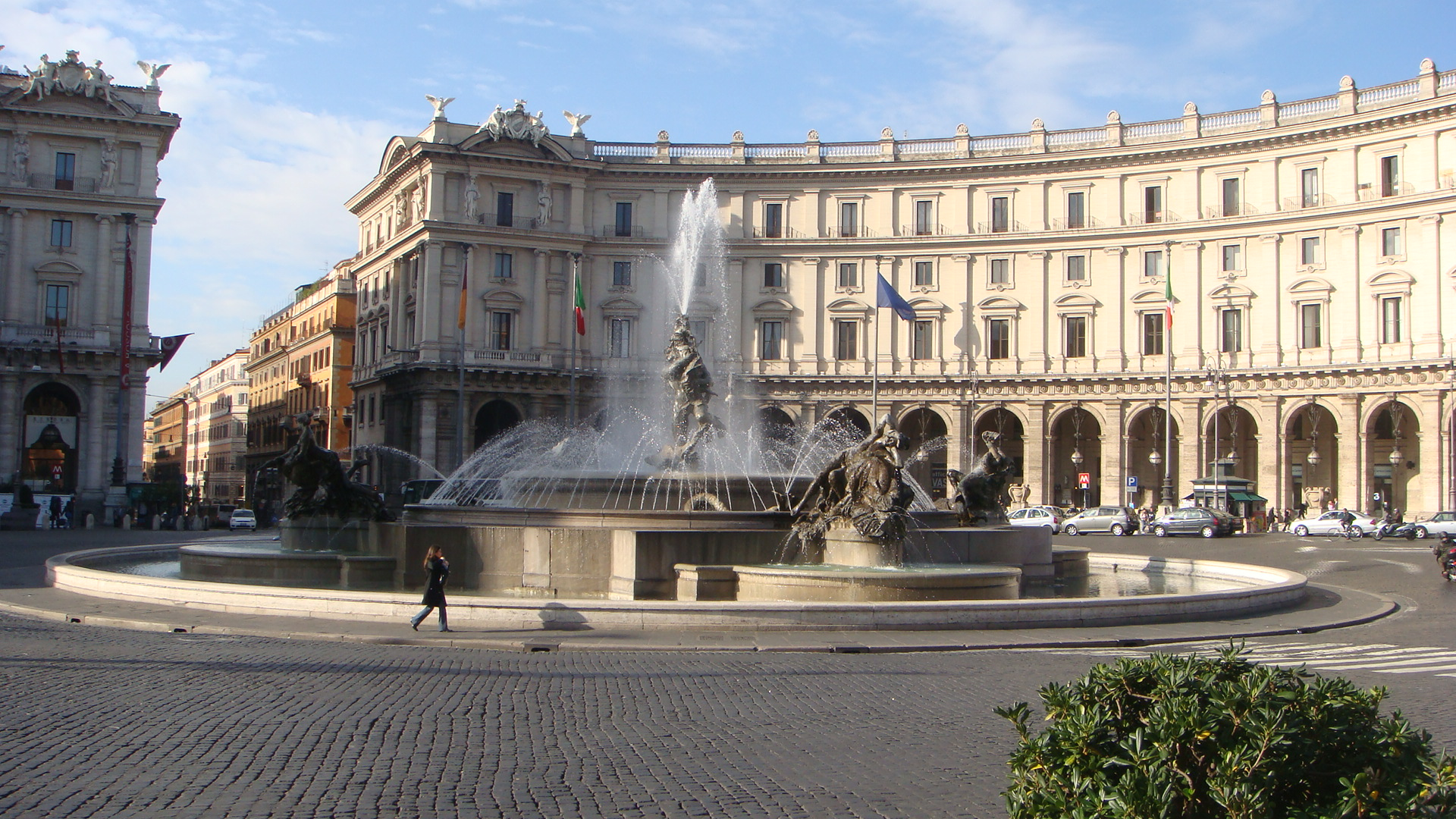
Piazza della Repubblica

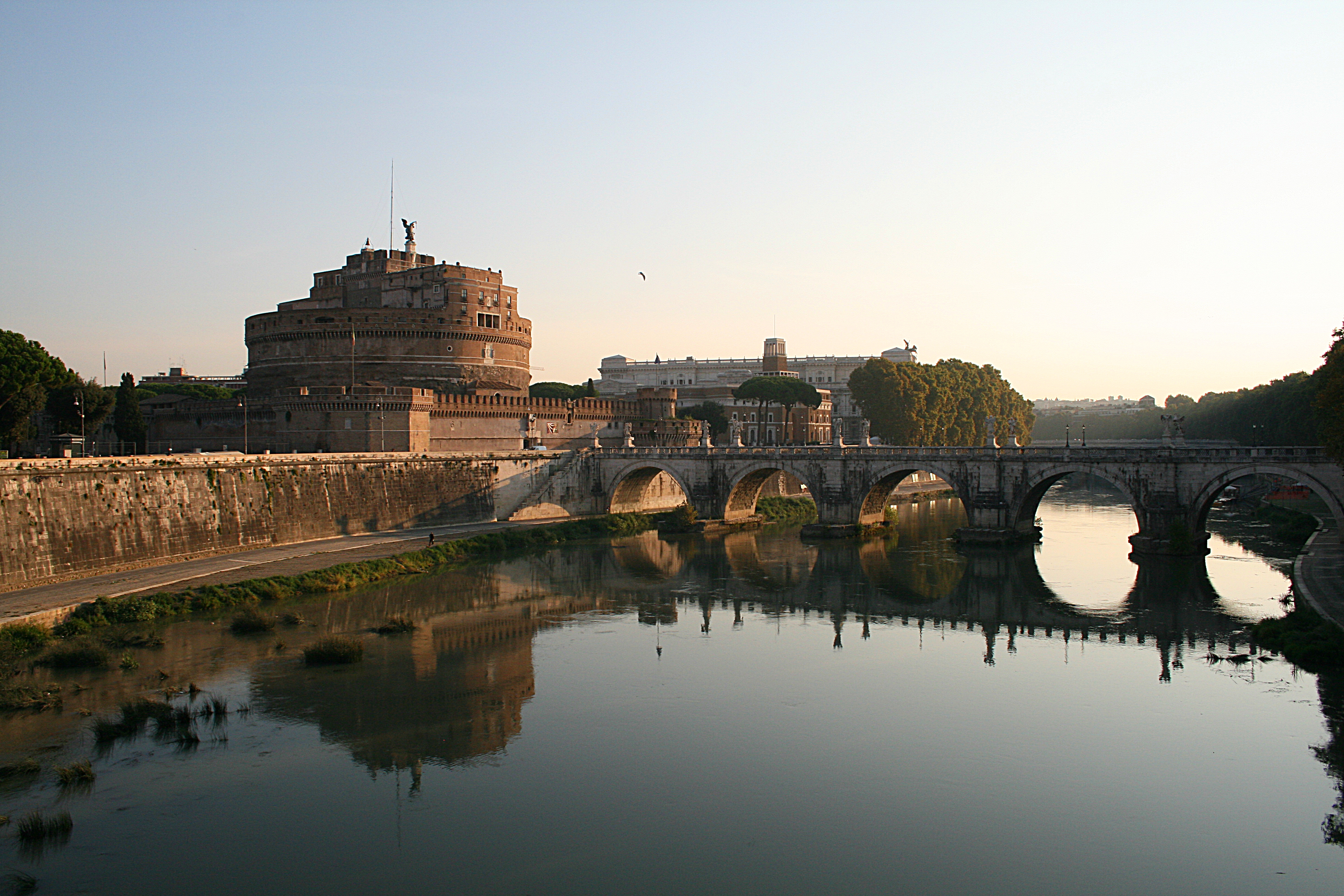
Ponte Sant'Angelo

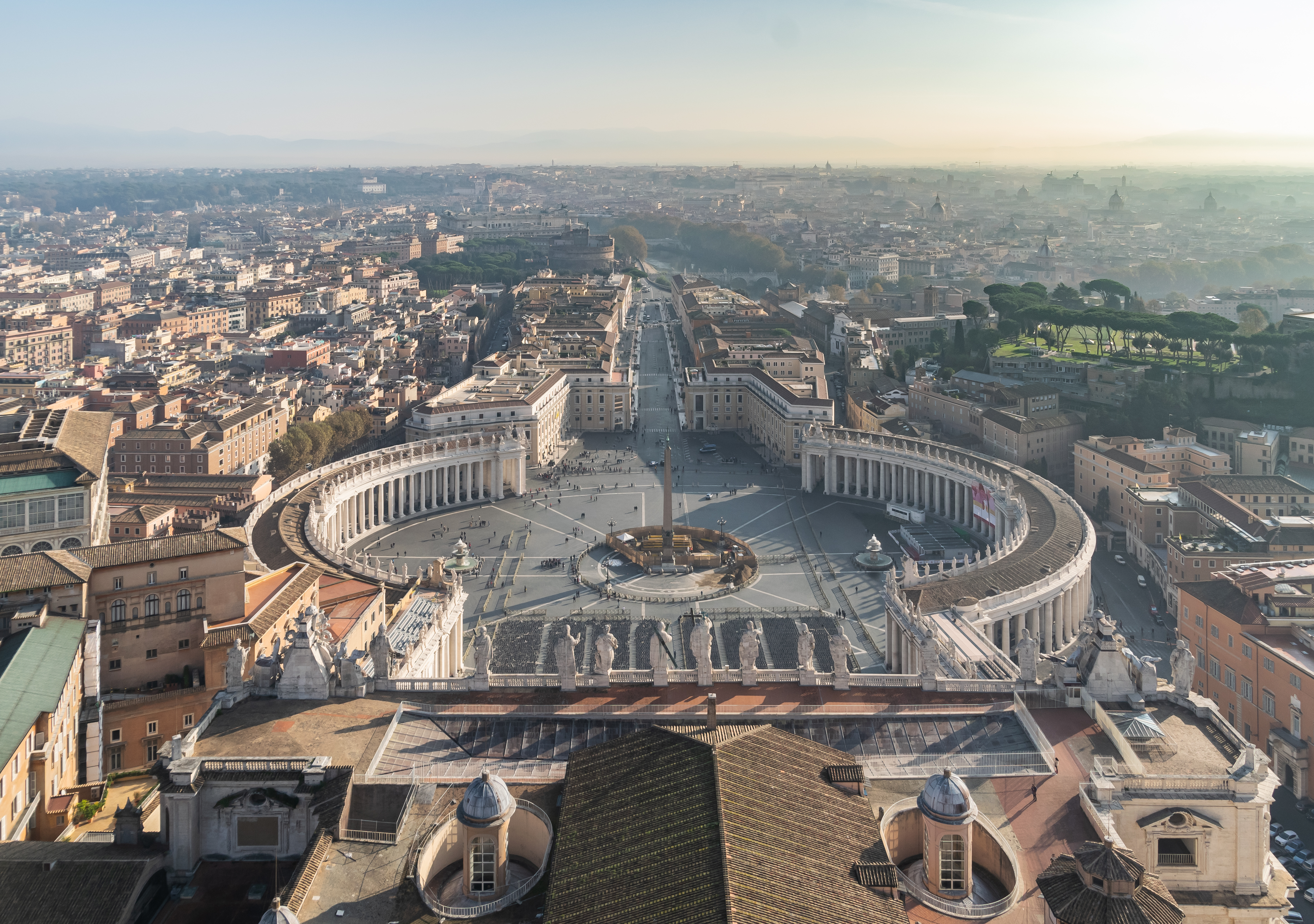
Saint Peter's Square, Vatican City

Ancient Rome

One of the symbols of Rome is the Colosseum (70-80 AD), the largest amphitheatre ever built in the Roman Empire. Originally capable of seating 60,000 spectators, it was used for gladiatorial combat. The list of the very important monuments of ancient Rome includes the Roman Forum, the Domus Aurea, the Pantheon, Trajan's Column, Trajan's Market, Ostia Antica, the several catacombs area, the Circus Maximus, the Baths of Caracalla, Castel Sant'Angelo, the Mausoleum of Augustus, the Ara Pacis, the Arch of Constantine, the Pyramid of Cestius, the Appia Antica Archaeological Park with the remains of Roman aqueducts, villas and tombs, and the Bocca della Verità (literally Mouth of Truth).

Medieval

Often overlooked, Rome's medieval heritage is one of the largest in Italian cities. Basilicas dating from the Paleochristian age include Santa Maria Maggiore and San Paolo Fuori le Mura (the second largely rebuilt in the 19th century), both housing precious 4th century AD mosaics. Later notable medieval mosaic and fresco art can be also found in the churches of Santa Maria in Trastevere, Santi Quattro Coronati and Santa Prassede. Lay buildings include a number of towers, the largest being the Torre delle Milizie and the Torre dei Conti, both next the Roman Forum, and the huge staircase leading to the basilica of Santa Maria in Ara Coeli.

Renaissance and Baroque

Rome was a major world center of the Italian Renaissance, second only to Florence, and was profoundly affected by the movement. The most impressive masterpiece of Renaissance architecture in Rome is the Piazza del Campidoglio by Michelangelo, along with the Palazzo Senatorio, seat of the city government. During this period, the great aristocratic families of Rome used to build opulent dwellings as the Palazzo del Quirinale (now seat of the President of the Republic), the Palazzo Venezia, the Palazzo Farnese, the Palazzo Barberini, the Palazzo Chigi (now seat of the Prime Minister), the Palazzo Spada, the Palazzo della Cancelleria, and the Villa Farnesina.

Rome is also famous for her huge and majestic squares (often adorned with obelisks), many of which were built in the 17th century. The principal squares are Piazza Navona, Piazza di Spagna, Campo de' Fiori, Piazza Venezia, Piazza Farnese and Piazza della Minerva. One of the most emblematic examples of the baroque art is the Fontana di Trevi by Nicola Salvi. Other notable baroque palaces of the 17th century are the Palazzo Madama, now seat of the Italian Senate and the Palazzo Montecitorio, now seat of the Chamber of Deputies of Italy.

Rome was the home of some of the greatest exponents of the Roman Baroque movement, such as Gian Lorenzo Bernini, Francesco Borromini, Pietro da Cortona.

Neoclassicism

In 1870, Rome became capital city of the new Kingdom of Italy. During this time, neoclassicism, a building style influenced by the architecture of Antiquity, became a predominant influence in Roman architecture. In this period many great palaces in neoclassical styles were built to host ministries, embassies and other governing agencies. One of the best-known symbol of Roman neoclassicism is the Monument of Vittorio Emanuele II or "Altar of Fatherland", where the grave of the Unknown Soldier, that represents the 650,000 Italians that fell in World War I, is located.

Rationalist architecture

The Fascist regime that ruled in Italy between 1922 and 1943 developed an architectural style which was characterized by its linkages with ancient Rome architecture. The most important fascist site in Rome is the E.U.R. district, built in 1935. It was originally conceived for the 1942 world exhibition, and was called "E.42" ("Esposizione 42"). However, the world exhibition never took place because Italy entered the Second World War in 1940. The most representative building of the Fascist style at E.U.R. is the Palazzo della Civiltà Italiana (1938–1943), the iconic design of which has been labelled the cubic or Square Colosseum. After World War II, the Roman authorities found that they already had the seed of an off-centre business district that other capitals were still planning (London Docklands and La Defense in Paris). Also the Palazzo della Farnesina, the actual seat of Italian Foreign Ministry, was designed in 1935 in fascist style.

==== Vatican City ====
The city of Rome surrounds the Vatican City, the enclave of the Holy See, which is a separate sovereign state. It hosts Saint Peter's Square with the Saint Peter's Basilica. The open space before the basilica was redesigned by Gian Lorenzo Bernini, from 1656 to 1667, under the direction of Pope Alexander VII, as a forecourt, designed "so that the greatest number of people could see the Pope give his blessing, either from the middle of the façade of the church or from a window in the Vatican Palace" (Norwich 1975 p 175). In Vatican City there are also the Vatican Library, Vatican Museums with the Sistine Chapel, the Raphael Rooms and other important works of Leonardo da Vinci, Raphael, Giotto, and Botticelli. Vatican City is an independent country situated inside Rome.

==== Museums and galleries ====
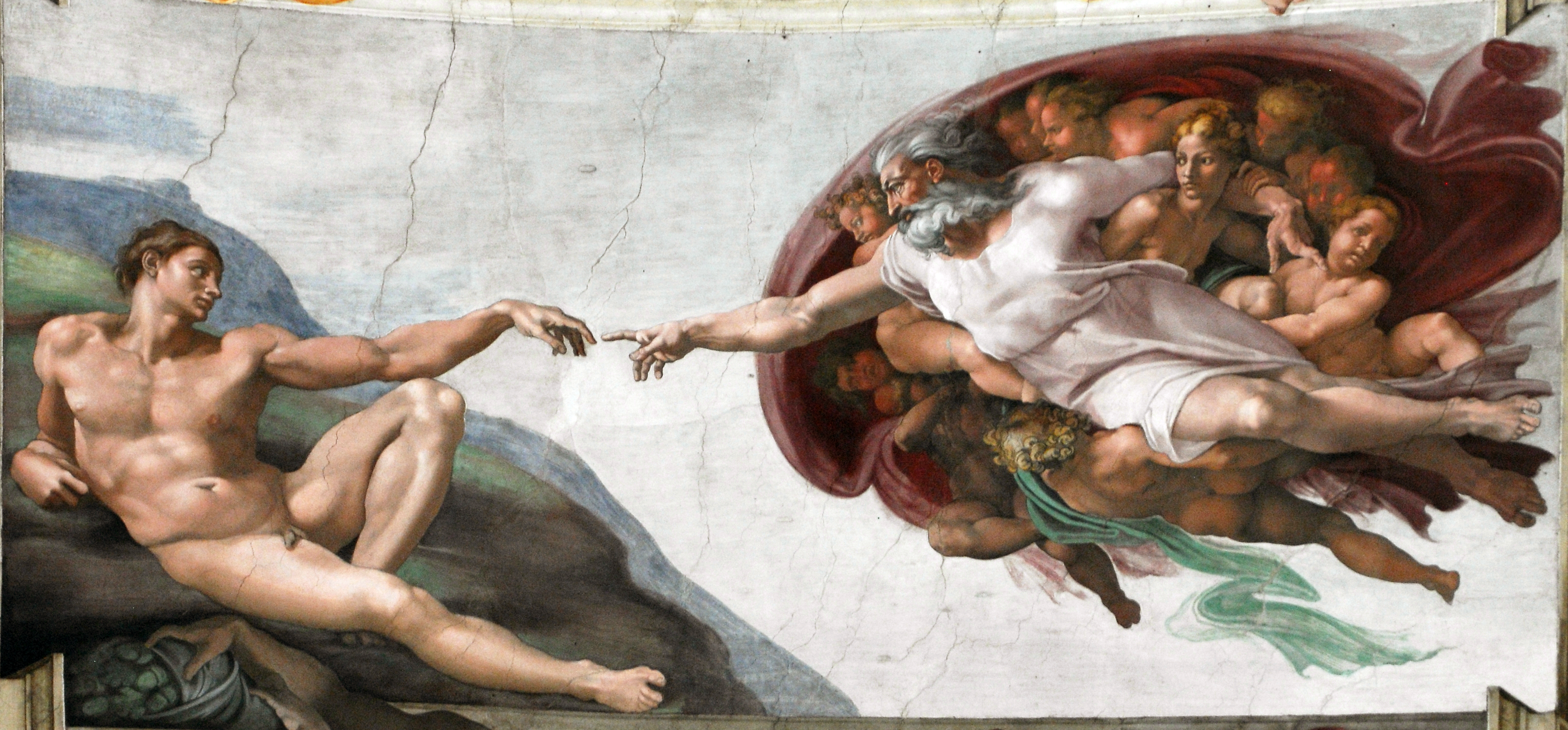
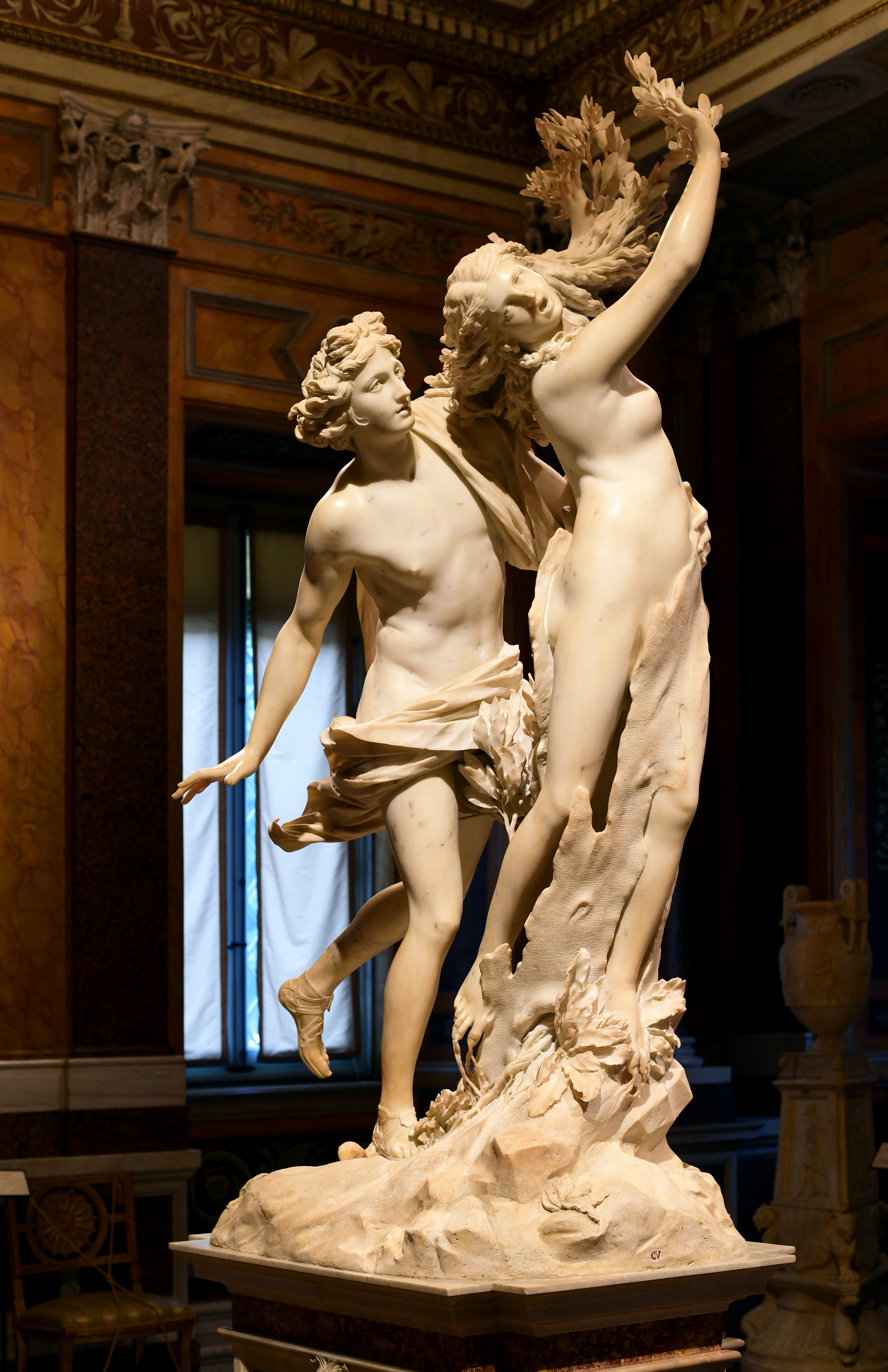
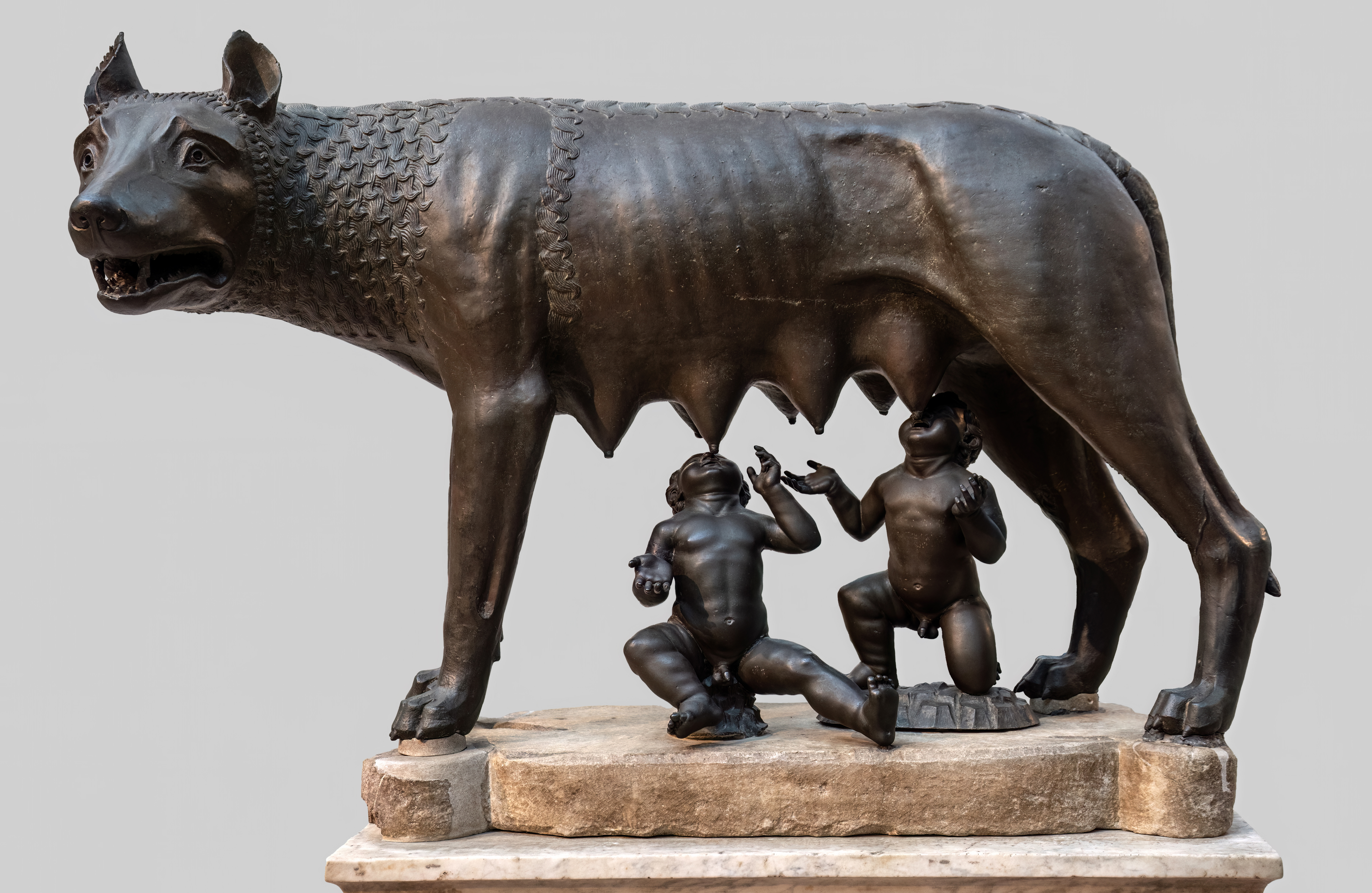
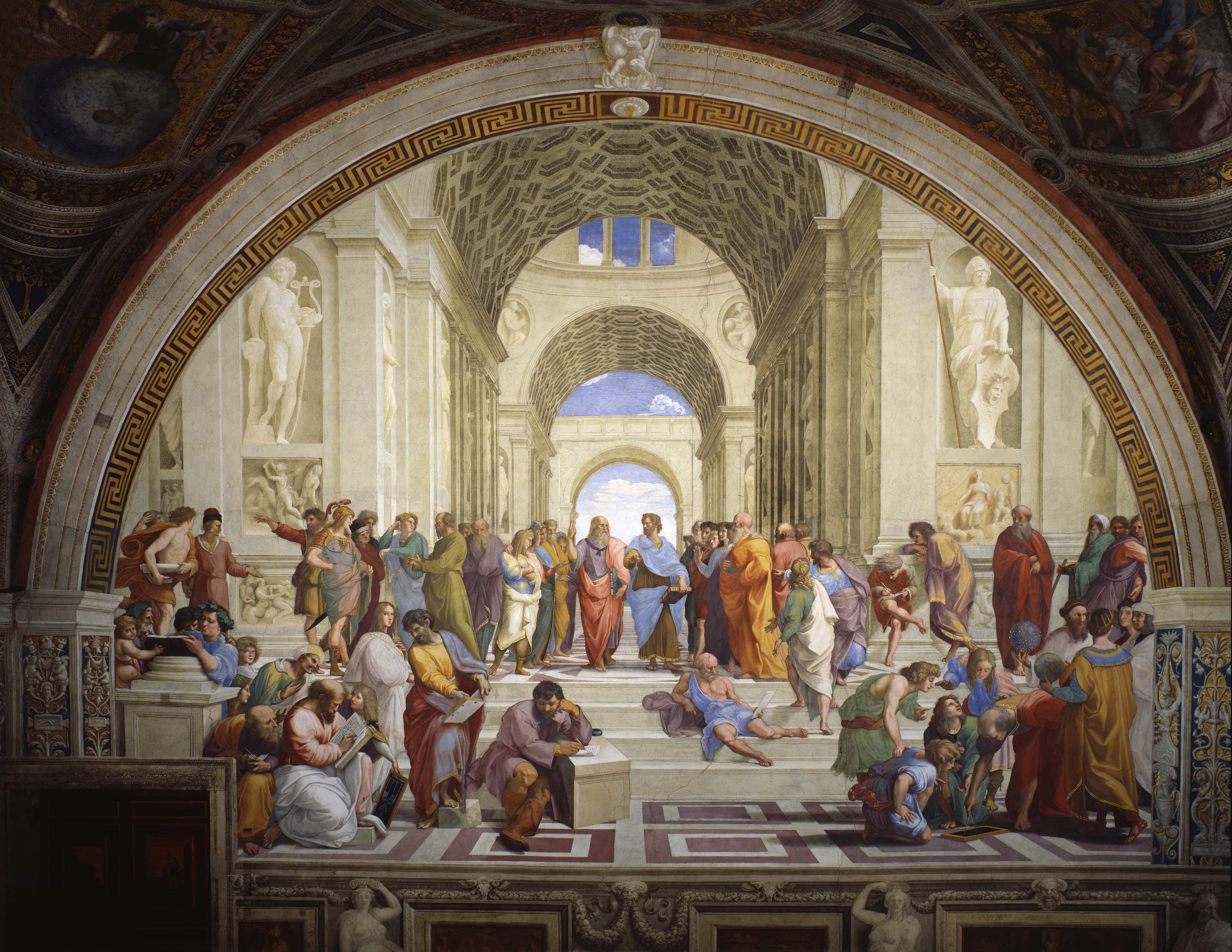
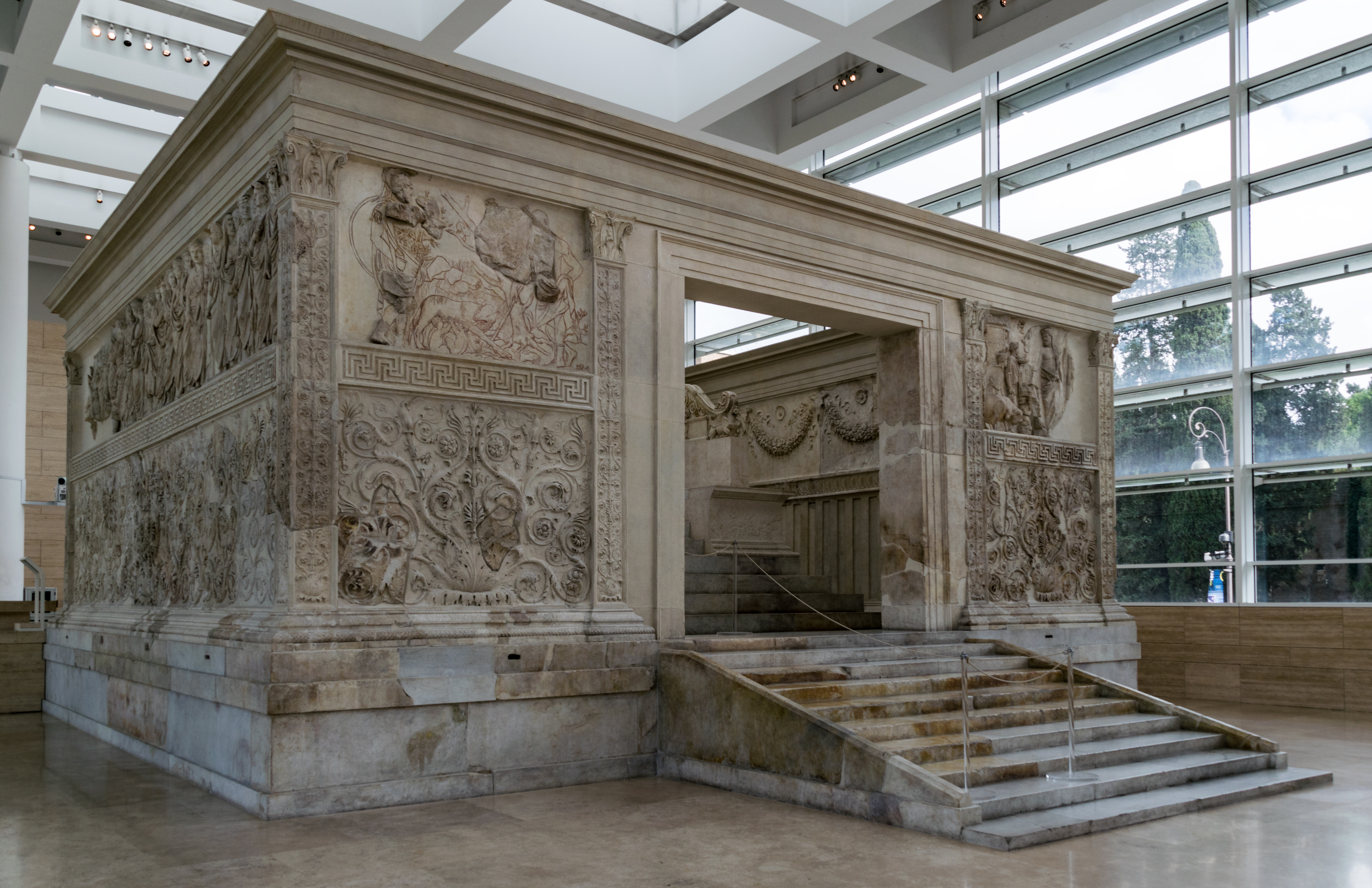
Left from top:
- The Creation of Adam fresco by Michelangelo Buonarroti. Sistine Chapel. Vatican Museums.
- Apollo and Daphne by Bernini. Galleria Borghese.
- Capitoline Wolf, symbol of Rome. Capitoline Museums.
- The School of Athens by Raphael. Vatican Museums.
- The Ara Pacis Augustae.

Rome's museum offerings are among the world's most extensive, reflecting its long and storied history spanning 28 centuries. Rome was the political, military, and cultural heart of the Roman Empire for about a millennium, and this has resulted in an enormous cultural legacy, of riches built by the Romans themselves: monuments, temples, statues and artifacts discovered and preserved in Roman museums, but also immense riches from every corner of the Empire, particularly Greece, Egypt, and Asia Minor. As the center of the Catholic Church, successive Popes over the centuries have always been great patrons of art, with the construction of the Vatican Museums, one of the world's largest museum complexes, housing priceless works such as the Sistine Chapel with Michelangelo's frescoes and the Raphael Rooms. Rome was an important center of the Renaissance and the birthplace of the Baroque and Neoclassical movements. Between the 15th and 18th centuries, powerful Roman families such as the Barberini, Borghese, and Farnese collected and commissioned masterpieces from internationally renowned painters and sculptors. Over the centuries, the city has been a destination for artists, scholars, intellectuals, archaeologists, writers and travelers who contributed to expanding the artistic heritage through the flow of works of art, copies, donations, discoveries and cultural exchanges.

Among the most important museums and galleries of Rome, include:

- The Vatican Museums (around more than 6 million visitors per year), it is one of the world's most important museums, the collections span over 3,000 years of history, from Egyptian civilization to Imperial Rome, from the Middle Ages to the Renaissance and Baroque, from the Neoclassical to the Modern and Contemporary eras. It is a symbolic place for Catholic Christianity and for European and global culture. It houses key sites such as the Sistine Chapel and priceless works by Michelangelo, Raphael, Leonardo da Vinci, Caravaggio, and Bernini;
- The National Museum of Castel Sant'Angelo, is one of the most visited museums in Italy, located inside the monumental complex of the Mausoleum of Hadrian, exhibits collections of art, painting and archaeology. For this reason it can be considered at the same time a monument, an archaeological area and a museum;
- Vittoriano and Museo nazionale del Palazzo di Venezia abbreviated as "VIVE", is composed of the two buildings, inside the Vittoriano are some museums dedicated to the history of Italy, especially the Unification of Italy, Central Museum of the Risorgimento. While Palazzo Venezia is an art museum, which houses the National Library of Archaeology and History of Art which is the largest Italian library on art and archaeology;
- The Capitoline Museums, they constitute the main civic museum structure of Rome. It comprises the exhibition venues of Palazzo Nuovo, Palazzo dei Conservatori and the Tabularium in Piazza del Campidoglio. They are among the oldest public museums in the world, given that its foundation dates back to 1471 and its opening to the public in 1734, renowned for their artworks that narrate the history and culture of Ancient Rome;
- Museo Nazionale Romano, entirely dedicated to the prehistory and ancient history of Rome. The museum is made up of 4 exhibition spaces: the Baths of Diocletian, the Palazzo Massimo alle Terme, the Palazzo Altemps and the Crypta Balbi;
- The Museum of Roman Civilization, museum dedicated to aspects of Ancient Roman civilization;
- The Galleria Borghese, it houses part of the ancient Borghese Collection, which includes important works by Caravaggio, Raphael, Canova, Bernini and Titian. Started by cardinal Scipione Borghese, who is also responsible for the construction of the villa that houses the museum, the Villa Borghese Pinciana located within the Villa Borghese gardens;
- The Galleria Nazionale d'Arte Antica, it is the principal national collection of older paintings in Rome;
- The Villa Giulia National Etruscan Museum, it is the most important Etruscan museum in the world;
- Palazzo delle Esposizioni, designed by Pio Piacentini since 1877. The palace hosts numerous art events and exhibitions;
- The MAXXI, the most modern museum in the city. Designed by architect Zaha Hadid, it is the national museum dedicated to the art of the 21st century;
- La Galleria Nazionale, it houses the most complete collection dedicated to Italian and foreign art from the 19th century to the present.

==== Villas and gardens ====
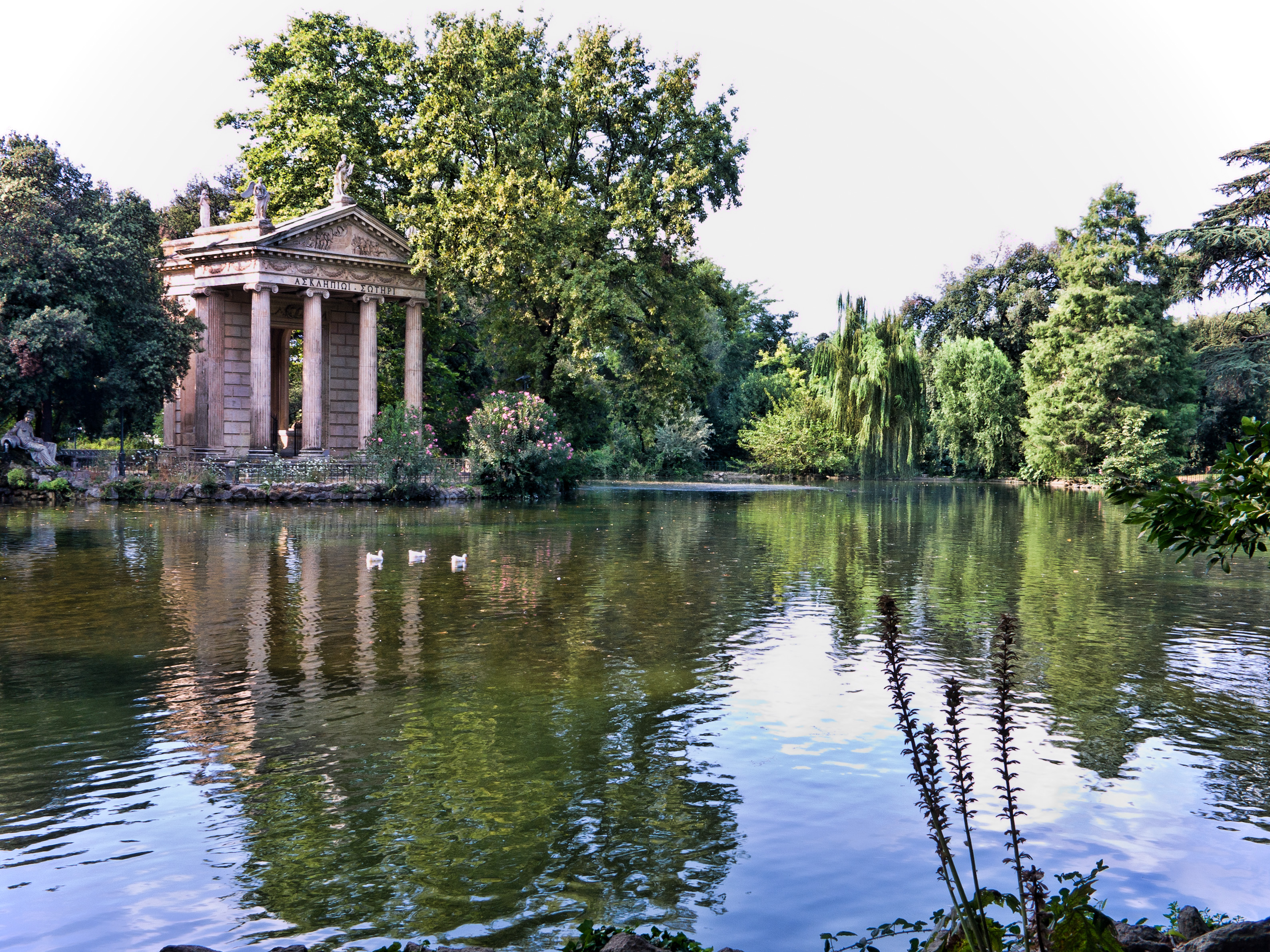
Villa Borghese: the 19th century "Temple of Aesculapius" built purely as a landscape feature, influenced by the lake at Stourhead, Wiltshire, England

The center of Rome is surrounded by some large green areas and opulent ancient villas, which are the remains of the crowns of villas which encircled the papal city. The villas are an expression of the style of gardens of the Renaissance period which was later called "Giardino all'Italiana" (Italian garden). Characterized by a geometric subdivision of spaces through rows of trees and hedges, plant sculptures of various shapes obtained by pruning evergreen bushes (topiary), geometric water features, often combined with architectural elements such as fountains and statues. Most of them were largely destroyed by real estate speculation at the end of the 19th century. The most important among the surviving ones are:

- Villa Borghese, with a large landscape garden in the naturalistic 19th century English style, containing a number of buildings, museums (see Galleria Borghese) and attractions;
- Villa Ada, the largest public landscaped park of Rome;
- Villa Doria Pamphili, the second largest with an area of 1.8 km^{2};
- Villa Torlonia, a splendid example of Art Nouveau mansion that was the Roman residence of Benito Mussolini;
- Villa Albani, commissioned by Cardinal Alessandro Albani to house his collection of antiquities and Roman sculpture, which soon filled the casino that faced the Villa down a series of formal parterres.

=== Art ===
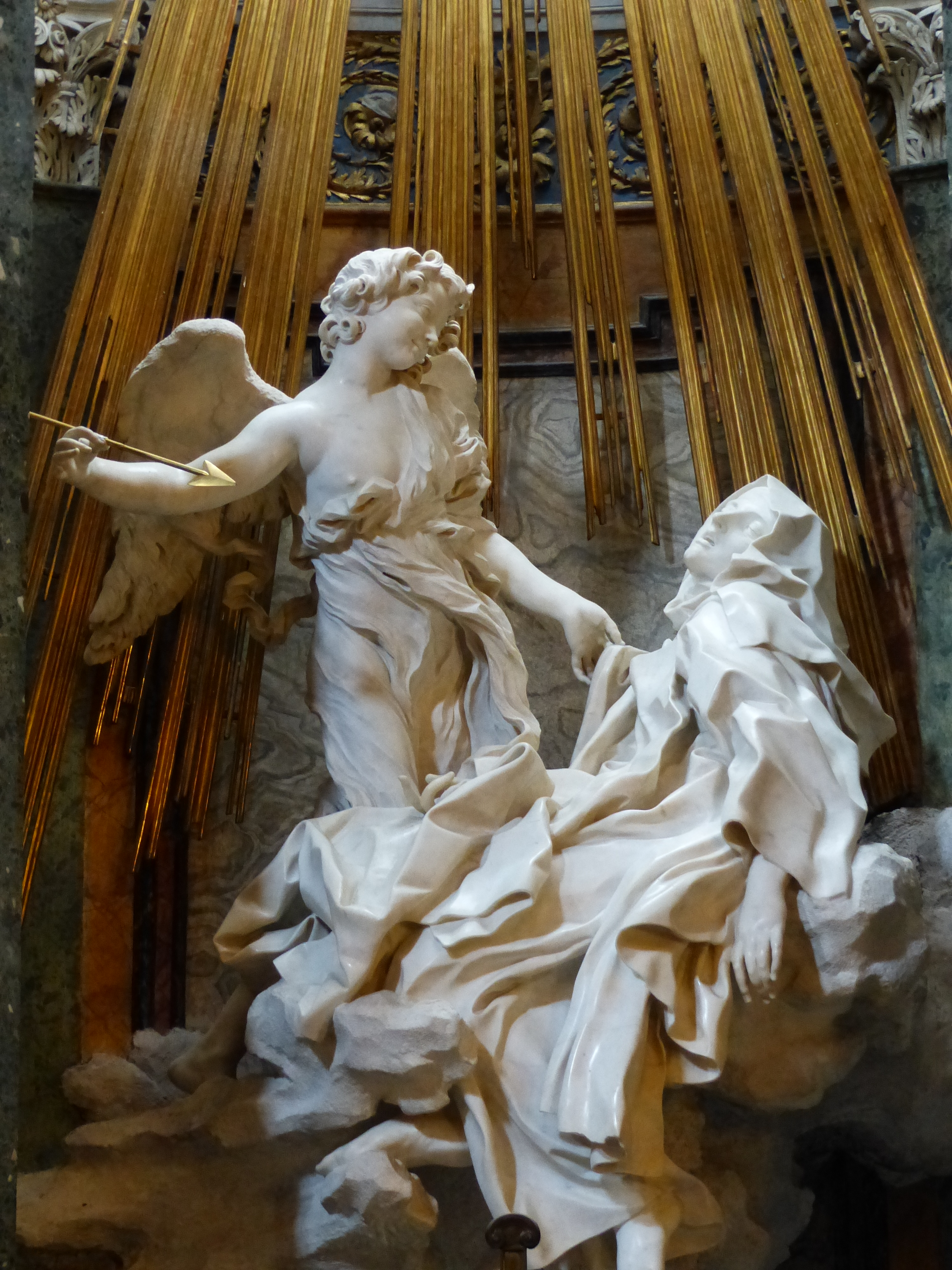
Ecstasy of Saint Teresa by Bernini. Masterpiece of Baroque art. Church of Santa Maria della Vittoria.

Rome contains a vast and impressive collection of art, sculpture, fountains, mosaics, frescos, and paintings, from all different periods. Rome first became a major artistic centre during ancient Rome, with forms of important Roman art such as architecture, painting, sculpture and mosaic work. Metal-work, coin-die and gem engraving, ivory carvings, figurine glass, pottery, and book illustrations are 'minor' forms of Roman artwork. Rome later became a major centre of Renaissance art, since the popes spent vast sums of money for the constructions of grandiose basilicas, palaces, piazzas and public buildings in general. Rome became one of Europe's major centres of Renaissance artwork, second only to Florence, and able to compare to other major cities and cultural centres, such as Paris and Venice. The city was affected greatly by the baroque, and Rome became the home of numerous artists and architects, such as Bernini, Caravaggio, Carracci, Borromini and Cortona, to name a few. In the late-18th century and early-19th century, the city was one of the centres of the Grand Tour, when wealthy, young English and other European aristocrats visited the city to learn about ancient Roman culture, art, philosophy and architecture. Rome hosted a great number of neoclassical and rococo artists, such as Pannini and Bernardo Bellotto. Today, the city is a major artistic centre, with numerous art institutes and museums.

== Literature ==
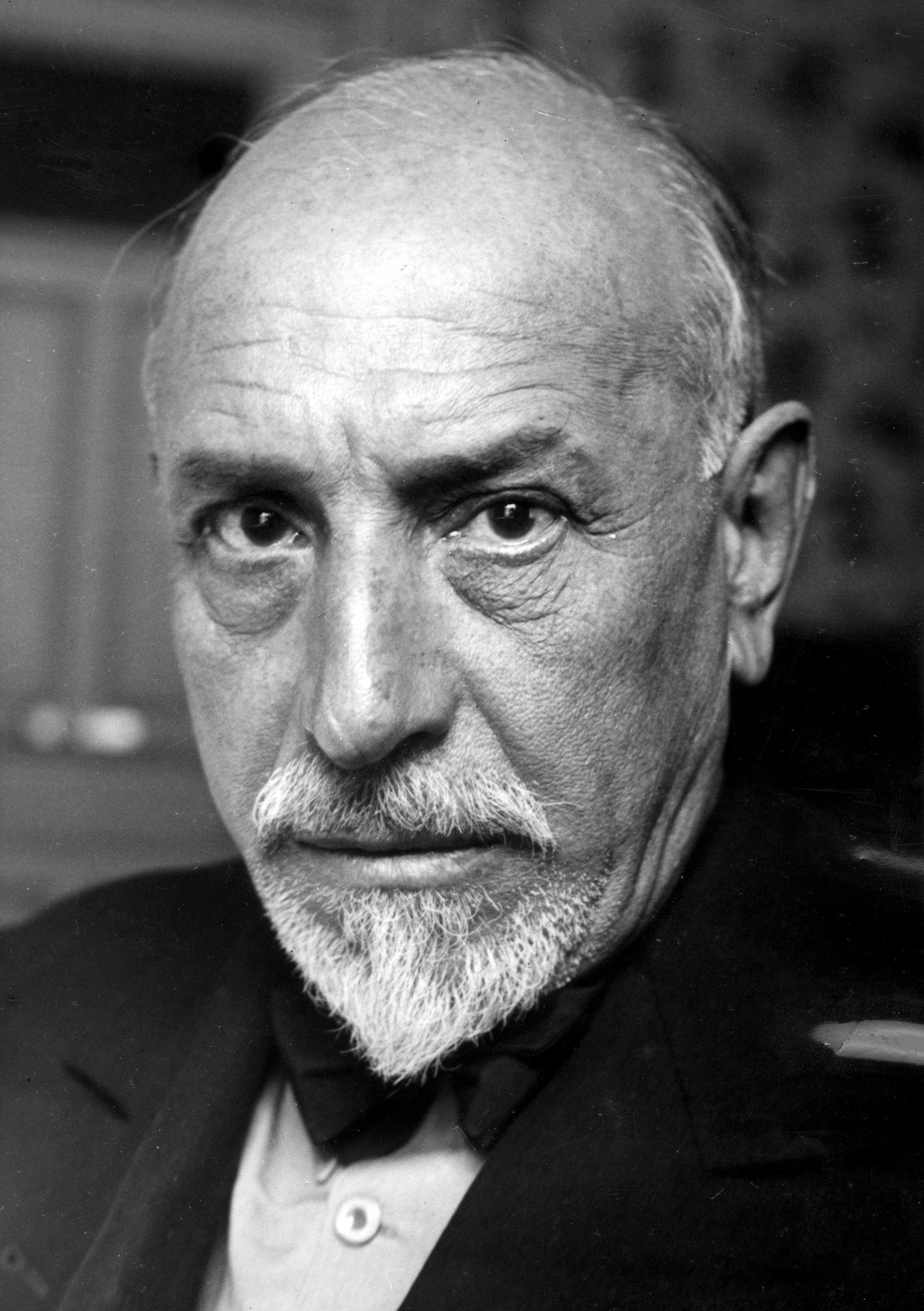
Luigi Pirandello, Nobel Prize in Literature 1934.

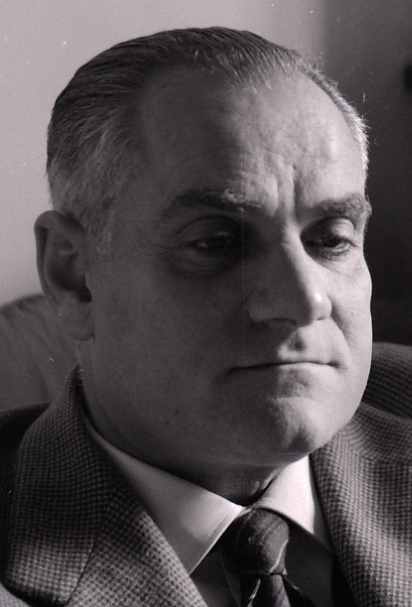
Alberto Moravia, Strega Prize 1952 and Viareggio Prize 1960. Major exponent of Italian neorealism. Photographic shot by Paolo Monti.

Birthplace of the Latin language. Since the times of Ancient Rome, the city was a great cultural center, Roman literature was heavily influenced by Greek authors from its beginning, but it was also very influential and left a deep mark on Western literature. In this period, in fact, poetic currents were born such as that of the "Poetae novi" or "neòteroi" (new poets) and lyric poetry and names such as Horace, Catullus, Cato and Sallust stood out. Also famous and characteristic was the image of Virgil, who, crossing several literary styles, composed works of great value still cared for, including the Aeneid, a legendary epic poem in Latin.

In modern times, Rome has been for centuries a place of inspiration for many artists and writers, attracted by the ancient and historical beauties of the city. The first books printed in Italy were produced in Subiaco (a town near Rome) at the end of the 15th century, it was the first place in Italy to be equipped with a printing house for printing books, founded by the Germans Konrad Sweynheim and Arnold Pannartz, inside the Abbey of Saint Scholastica.

Rome, together with Naples, Florence and Milan, has always been one of the leading cities of Italian and European literature. During the end of the 17th century, the Academy of Arcadia was founded in Rome. It was born on the occasion of the meeting, in the convent annexed to the church of San Pietro in Montorio, of 14 men of letters, belonging to the circle of Queen Christina of Sweden. It was a meeting place for many writers, poets, artists, politicians, aristocrats, composers and musicians of the time. The academy is considered not only as a simple school of thought, but as a real literary movement, between the Baroque and the Age of Enlightenment, which developed and spread throughout Italy during the 18th century in response to the "Baroque taste", an artistic movement that was considered by many critics to be bizarre, eccentric and artificial.

The 18th and 19th centuries were dominated by internationally renowned writers who lived in Rome, such as Johann Wolfgang von Goethe with his Italian Journey and his tribute of love to the eternal city, by Stendhal and his evocative Promenade dans Rome (Roman Walks). Located at the foot of the Spanish Steps in Piazza di Spagna, there is the house museum where John Keats and Percy Bysshe Shelley lived. But also Nikolai Gogol and Hans Christian Andersen, in the city the Danish writer wrote his first novel L'Improvvisatore.

During the 20th century Rome was the home of some of the greatest Italian writers: including Gabriele d'Annunzio, Luigi Pirandello, Carlo Emilio Gadda, Italo Calvino, Tommaso Landolfi, Carlo Levi, Luigi Malerba, Giorgio Manganelli, Alberto Moravia, Elsa Morante, Pier Paolo Pasolini. Some of the greatest novels of the era are set in Rome, including D'Annunzio's Il Piacere set in Rome at the end of the 19th century, The Late Mattia Pascal by Luigi Pirandello, That Awful Mess on Via Merulana by Carlo Emilio Gadda set in the city during the Fascist period, History by Elsa Morante set in Rome during and immediately after the Second World War, Ragazzi di vita by Pier Paolo Pasolini set in the suburbs of post-war Rome.

=== Libraries and archives ===
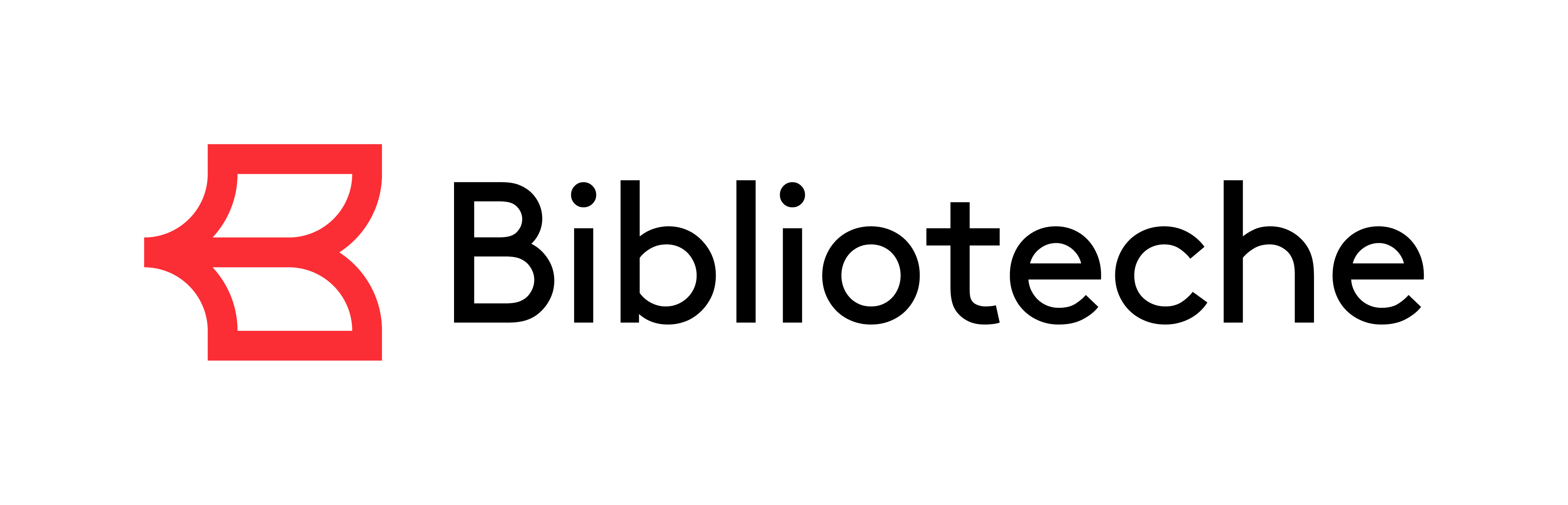
The logo of the "Biblioteche di Roma" system

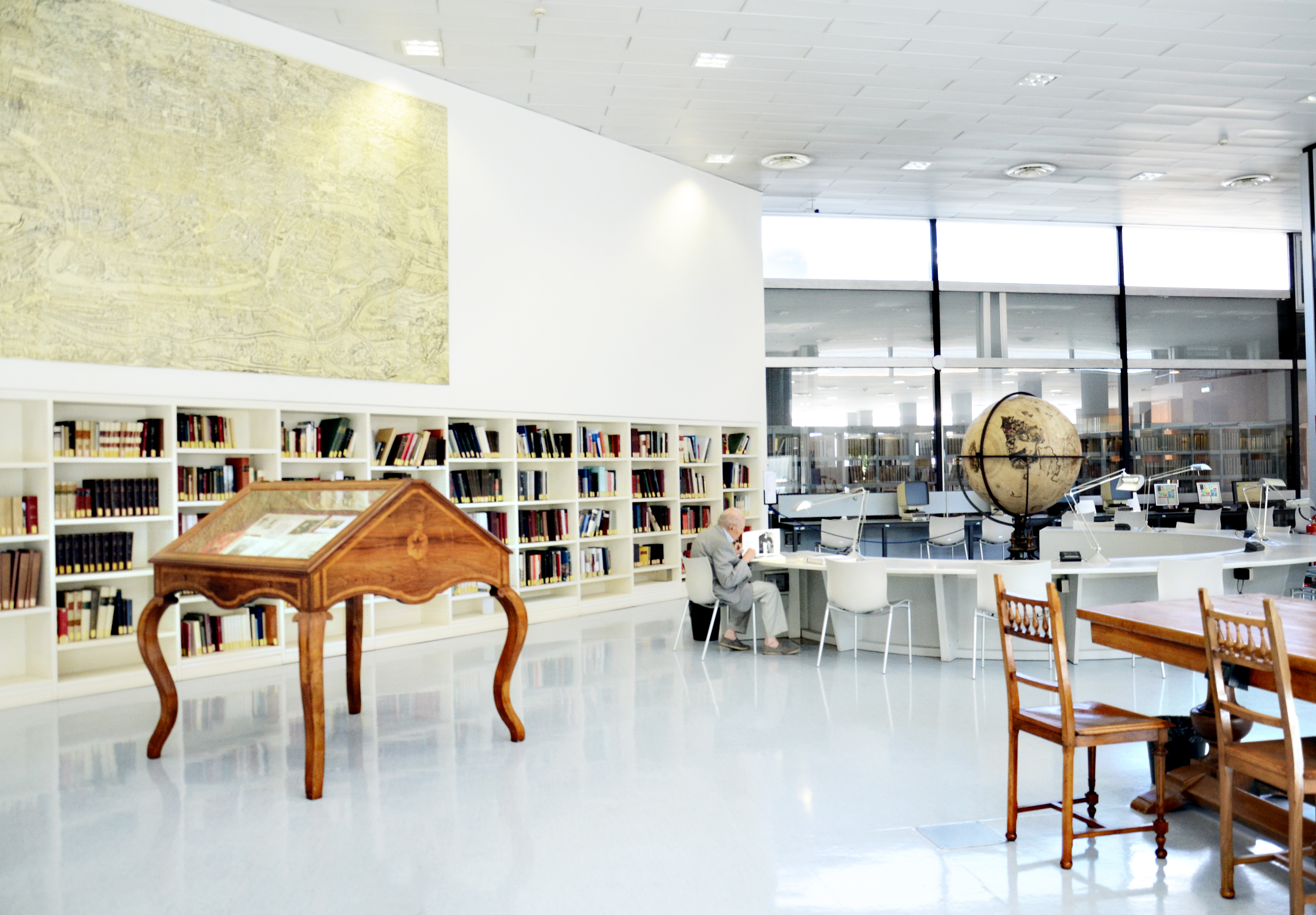
The National Central Library of Rome (BNCR)

The National Central Library of Rome (BNCR) is, together with the National Central Library of Florence (BNCF), one of the two Italian national libraries that have the main task of collecting and preserving all Italian publications. It is located in Viale Castro Pretorio, near Roma Termini station, in Rome. The BNCR is the largest libraries in Italy. Its permanent hub is "La stanza di Elsa", where the suggestions of Elsa Morante's writing laboratory are recreated through the original furnishings that made up her studio. There are also furniture, portraits, archives and autographed papers of Gabriele d'Annunzio, Umberto Saba, Grazia Deledda, Carlo Levi, Pier Paolo Pasolini and many others.

The Italian word for library is the expression: "Biblioteca", which derives from the Latin "Bibliotheca" which in turn takes its name from the Greek expression "βιβλίον" (biblíon) «book».

The city has numerous libraries of various types and sizes: the Biblioteca Angelica; the Vatican Apostolic Library, in the Vatican; the Biblioteca Casanatense; the Library of the Institute of the Italian Encyclopedia, the Hertziana Library; the Biblioteca Universitaria Alessandrina of the Sapienza University; the Biblioteca Vallicelliana. The name Biblioteche di Roma refers to the network of 37 public libraries in Rome.

Numerous Roman libraries participate in the National Library Service of Italy (SBN). Thanks to the "OPAC SBN". it is possible to carry out web searches in the current catalogues of over 100 library institutions in the city, aggregated in the various regional centres.

As the capital of Italy, the city has two National Archives: the Central Archives of the State, which preserves (with some exceptions) the documentation produced by the bodies and offices of the Italian State since its unification, and the State Archives of Rome, which until 1953 also performed the functions of the former.

The Vatican is also home to the Vatican Apostolic Archives.

== Cinema ==
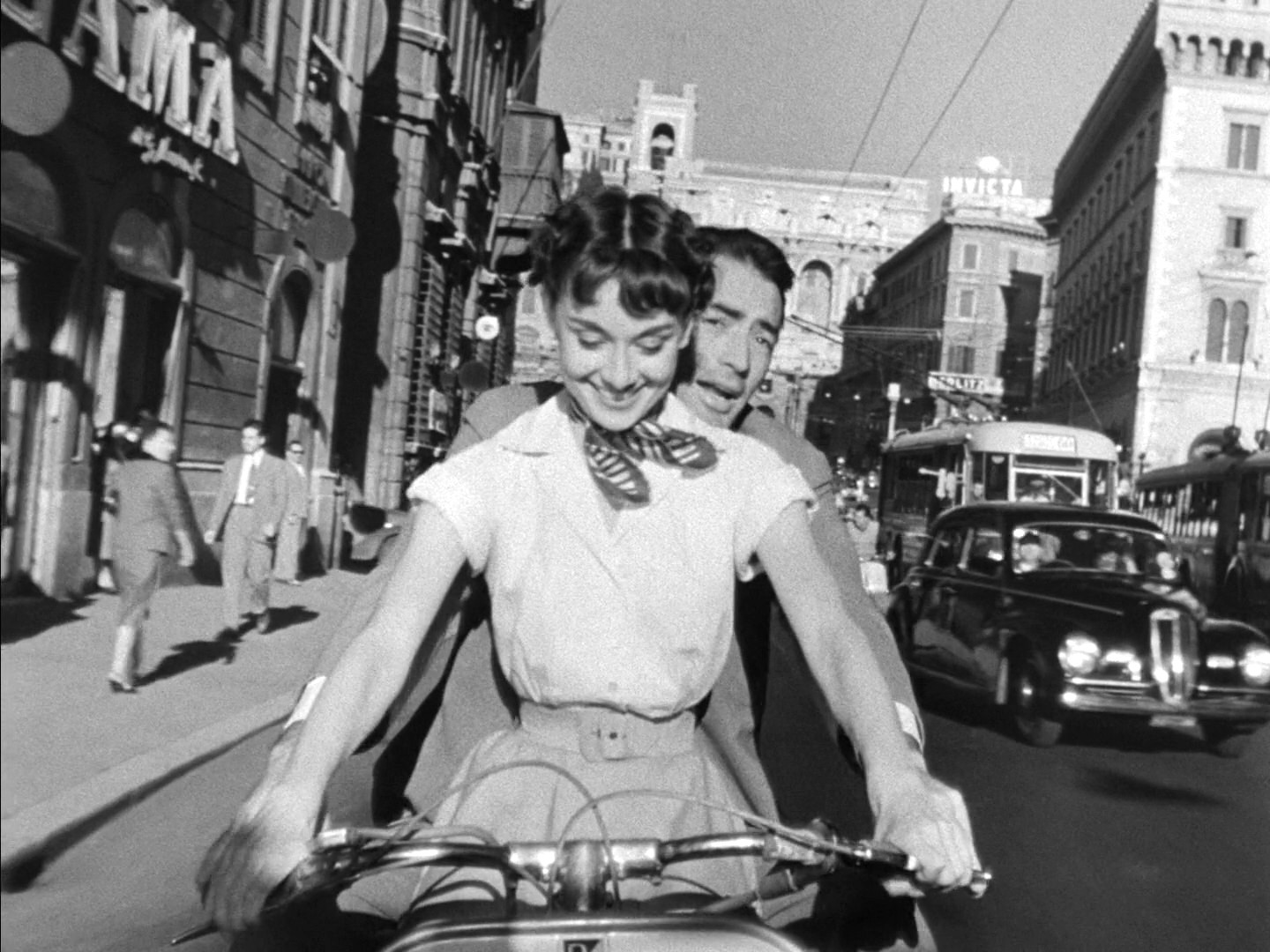
The Roman Holiday, a popular American film set in Rome.

Rome hosts the Cinecittà Studios, the largest film and television production facility in continental Europe and the centre of the Italian cinema, where a large number of today's biggest box office hits are filmed. The 99-acre (40-ha) studio complex is 5.6 miles (9 km) from the centre of Rome and is part of one of the biggest production communities in the world, second only to Hollywood, with well over 5,000 professionals—from period costume makers to visual effects specialists. More than 3,000 productions have been made on its lot, from recent features like The Passion of the Christ, Gangs of New York, Adult Swim, The Life Aquatic and Dino De Laurentiis’ Decameron, to such cinema classics as Ben-Hur, Cleopatra, and the films of Federico Fellini.

Founded in 1937 by Benito Mussolini, the studios were bombed by the Western Allies during the Second World War. In the 1950s, Cinecittà was the filming location for several large American film productions, and subsequently became the studio most closely associated with Federico Fellini. Today Cinecittà is the only studio in the world with pre-production, production, and full post-production facilities on one lot, allowing directors and producers to walk in with their script and "walk out" with a completed film.

== Language ==
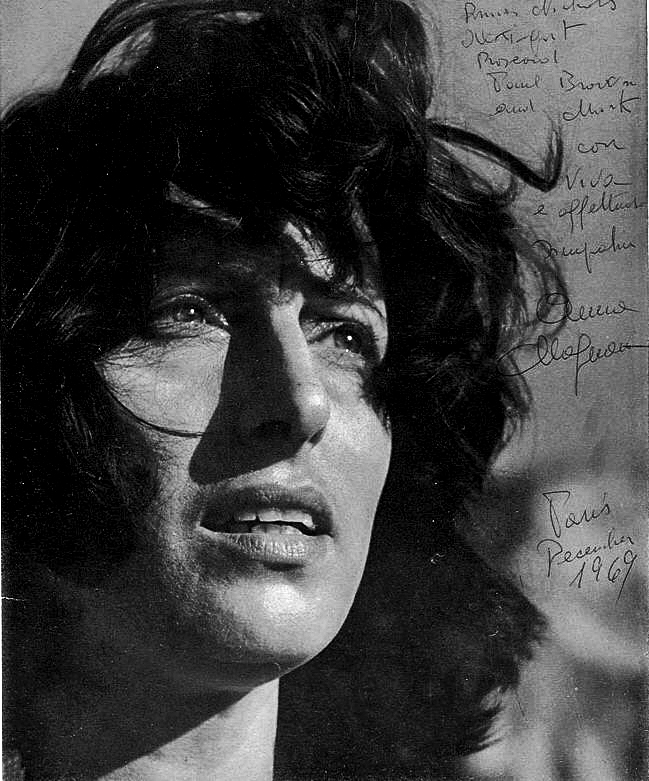
Anna Magnani, Academy Award for Best Actress 1956, one of the symbols of "Romanity"

The original language of Rome was Latin, which evolved during the Middle Ages into Italian. The latter emerged as the confluence of various regional dialects, among which the Tuscan dialect predominated, but the population of Rome also developed its own dialect, the Romanesco. The ancient romanesco, used during the Middle Ages, was a southern Italian dialect, very close to the Neapolitan. The influence of the Florentine culture during the renaissance, and, above all, the immigration to Rome of many Florentines who were among the two Medici Popes' (Leo X and Clement VII) suite, caused a strong change of the dialect, which resembled more the Tuscan varieties (the immigration of Florentines was mainly due to the Sack of Rome in 1527 and the subsequent demographic decrease). This remained largely confined to Rome until the 19th century, but then expanded other zones of Lazio (Civitavecchia, Latina), from the beginning of the 20th century, thanks to the rising population of Rome and to better transportation systems. As a consequence, Romanesco abandoned its traditional forms to mutate into the dialect spoken within the city, which is more similar to standard Italian, although remaining distinct from other Romanesco-influenced local dialects of Lazio. Dialectal literature in the traditional form Romanesco includes the works of such authors as Giuseppe Gioacchino Belli, Trilussa, and Cesare Pascarella. Contemporary Romanesco is mainly represented by popular actors such as Aldo Fabrizi, Alberto Sordi, Nino Manfredi, Anna Magnani, Gigi Proietti, Enrico Montesano, and Carlo Verdone, Paola Cortellesi.

== Entertainment and performing arts ==
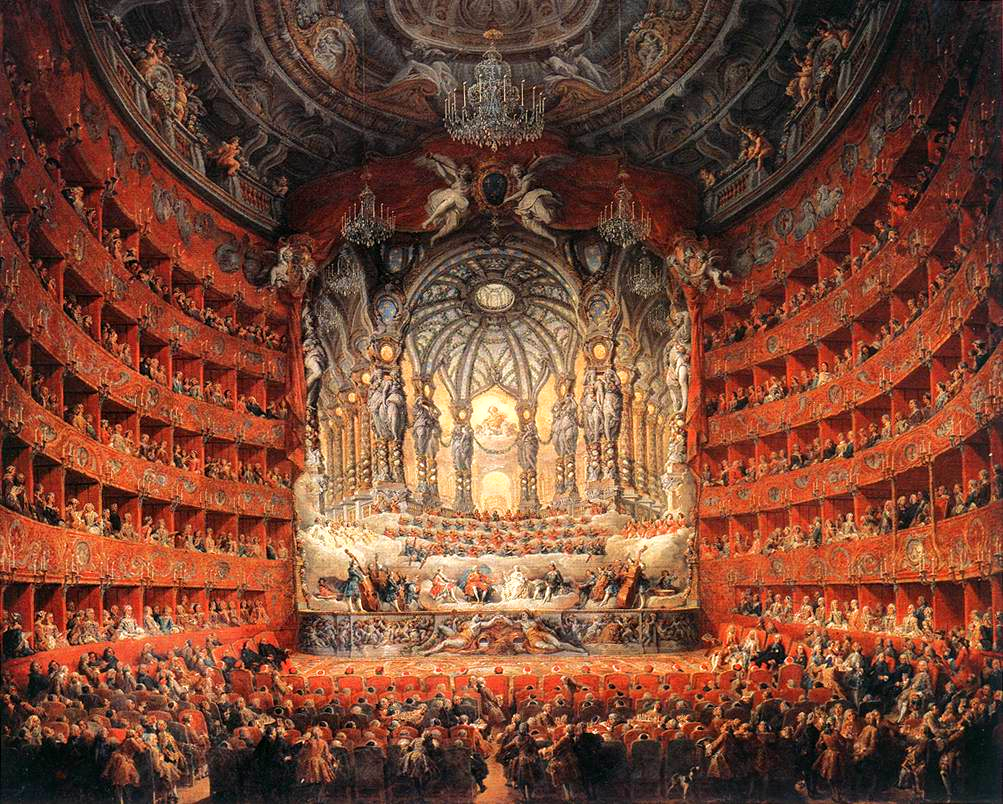
The Teatro Argentina (Panini, 1747)

Rome is an important centre for music, and it has an intense musical scene, including several prestigious music conservatories and theatres. It hosts the Accademia Nazionale di Santa Cecilia (founded in 1585), for which new concert halls have been built in the new Parco della Musica, one of the largest musical venues in the world. Rome also has an opera house, the Teatro dell'Opera di Roma, as well as several minor musical institutions. The city also played host to the Eurovision Song Contest in 1991 and the MTV Europe Music Awards in 2004.

Rome has also had a major impact in music history. The Roman School was a group of composers of predominantly church music, which were active in the city during the 16th and 17th centuries, therefore spanning the late Renaissance and early Baroque eras. The term also refers to the music they produced. Many of the composers had a direct connection to the Vatican and the papal chapel, though they worked at several churches; stylistically they are often contrasted with the Venetian School of composers, a concurrent movement which was much more progressive. By far the most famous composer of the Roman School is Giovanni Pierluigi da Palestrina, whose name has been associated for four hundred years with smooth, clear, polyphonic perfection. However, there were other composers working in Rome, and in a variety of styles and forms.

== Religion ==
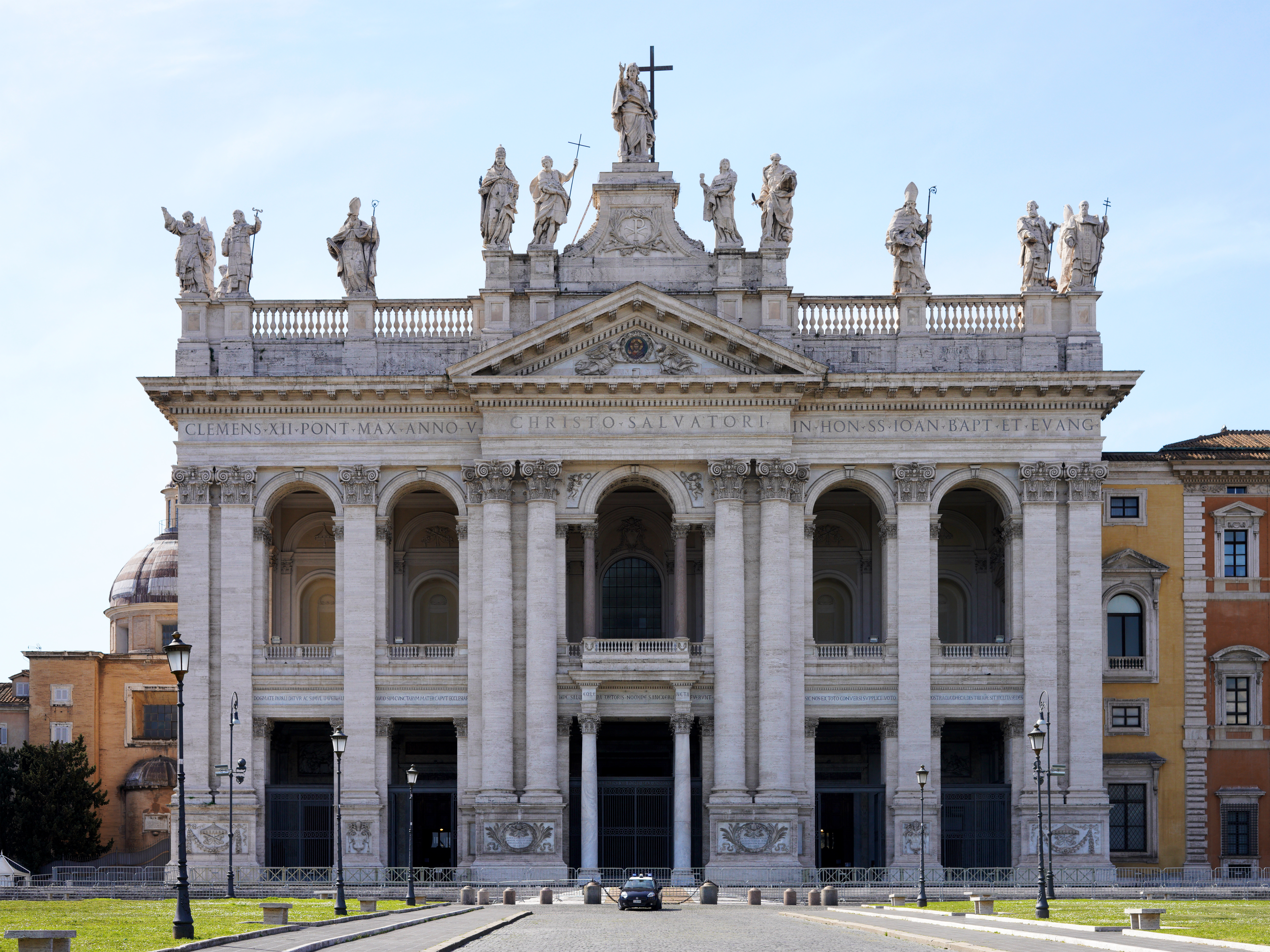
Archbasilica of St. John Lateran, mother church of the diocese of Rome, is the material representation of the Holy See, which has its residence here. It is the first of the four major papal basilicas and the oldest and most important basilica in the Western world.

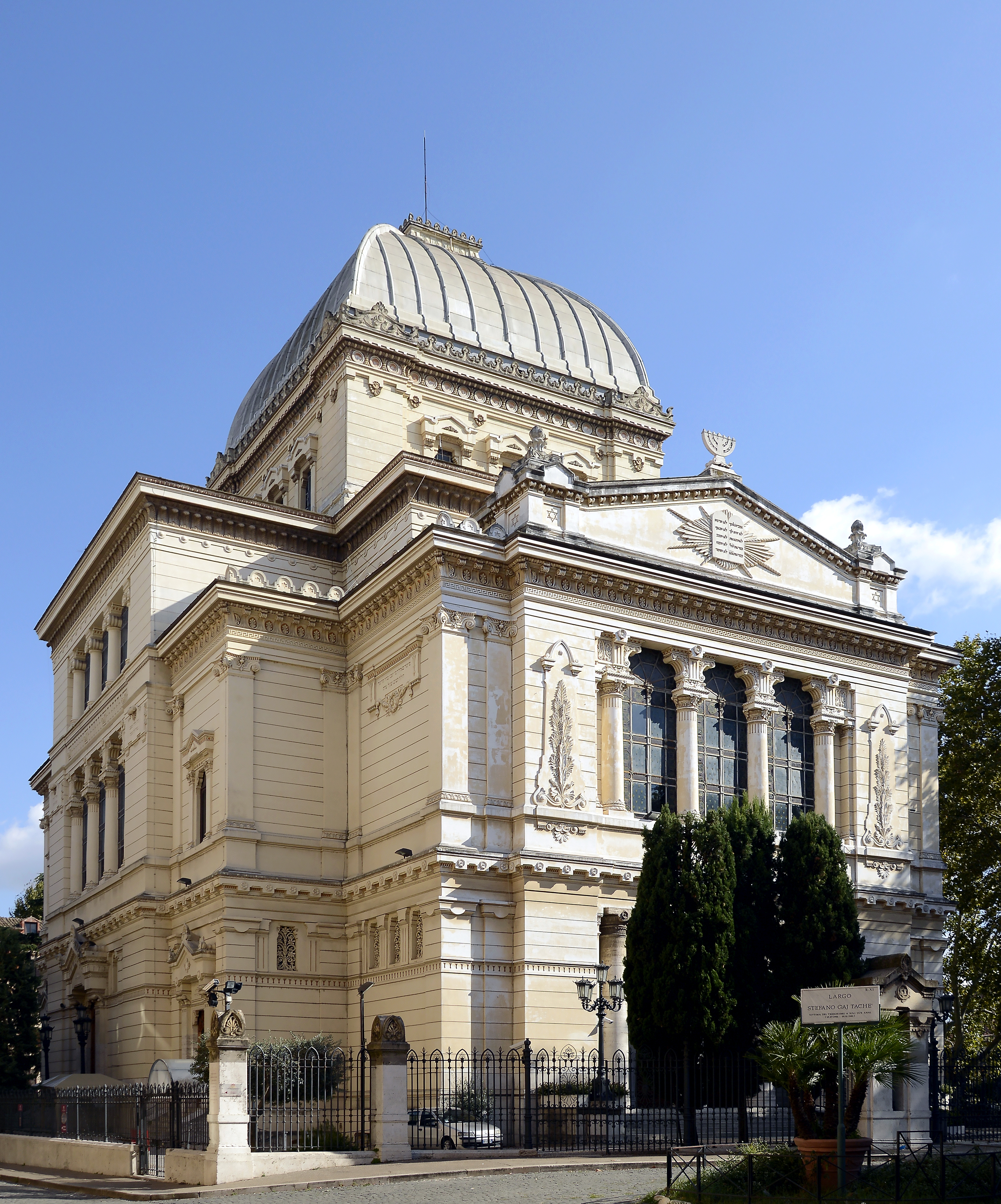
The Great Synagogue of Rome

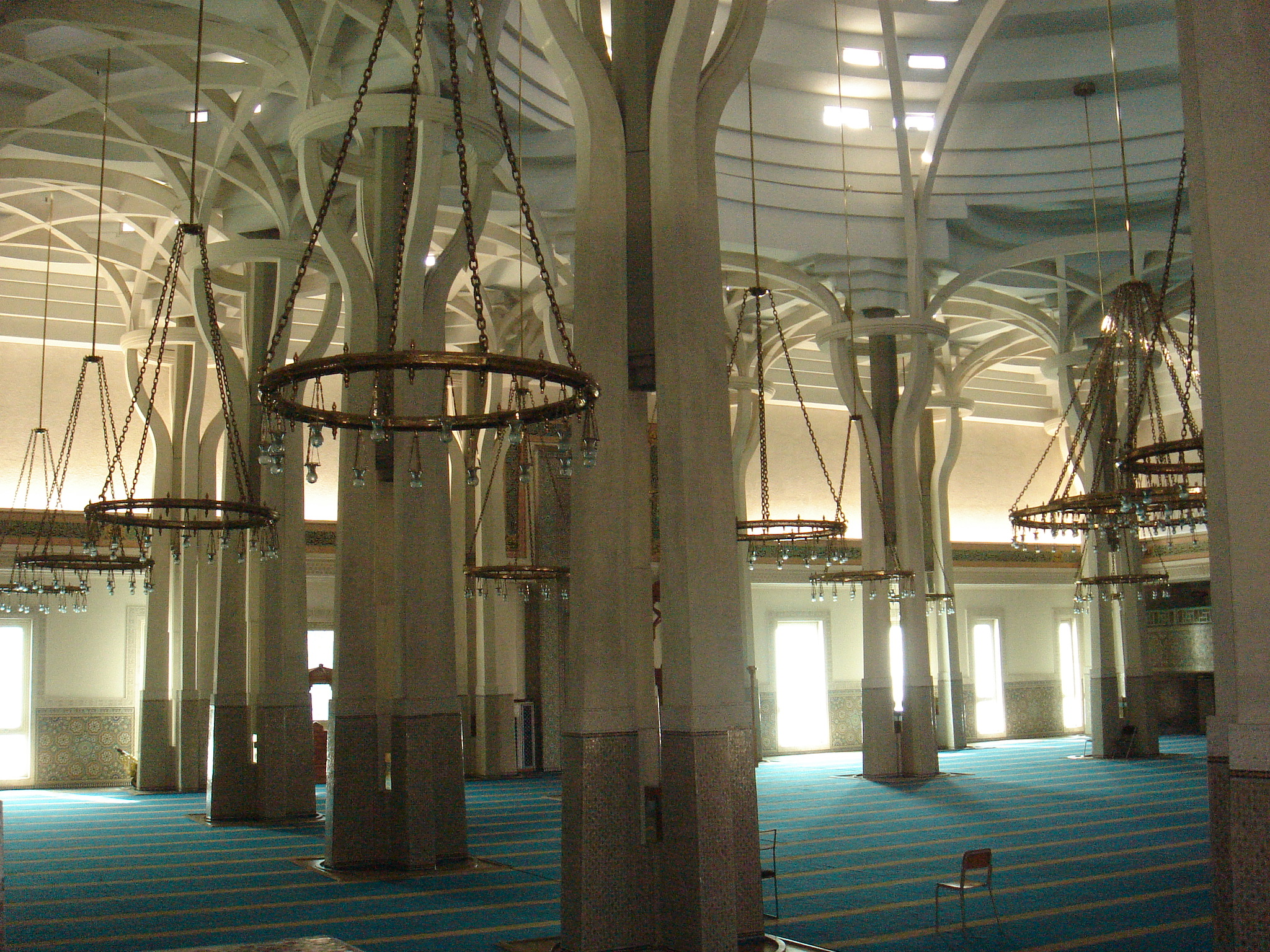
Mosque of Rome by Paolo Portoghesi, (1974)

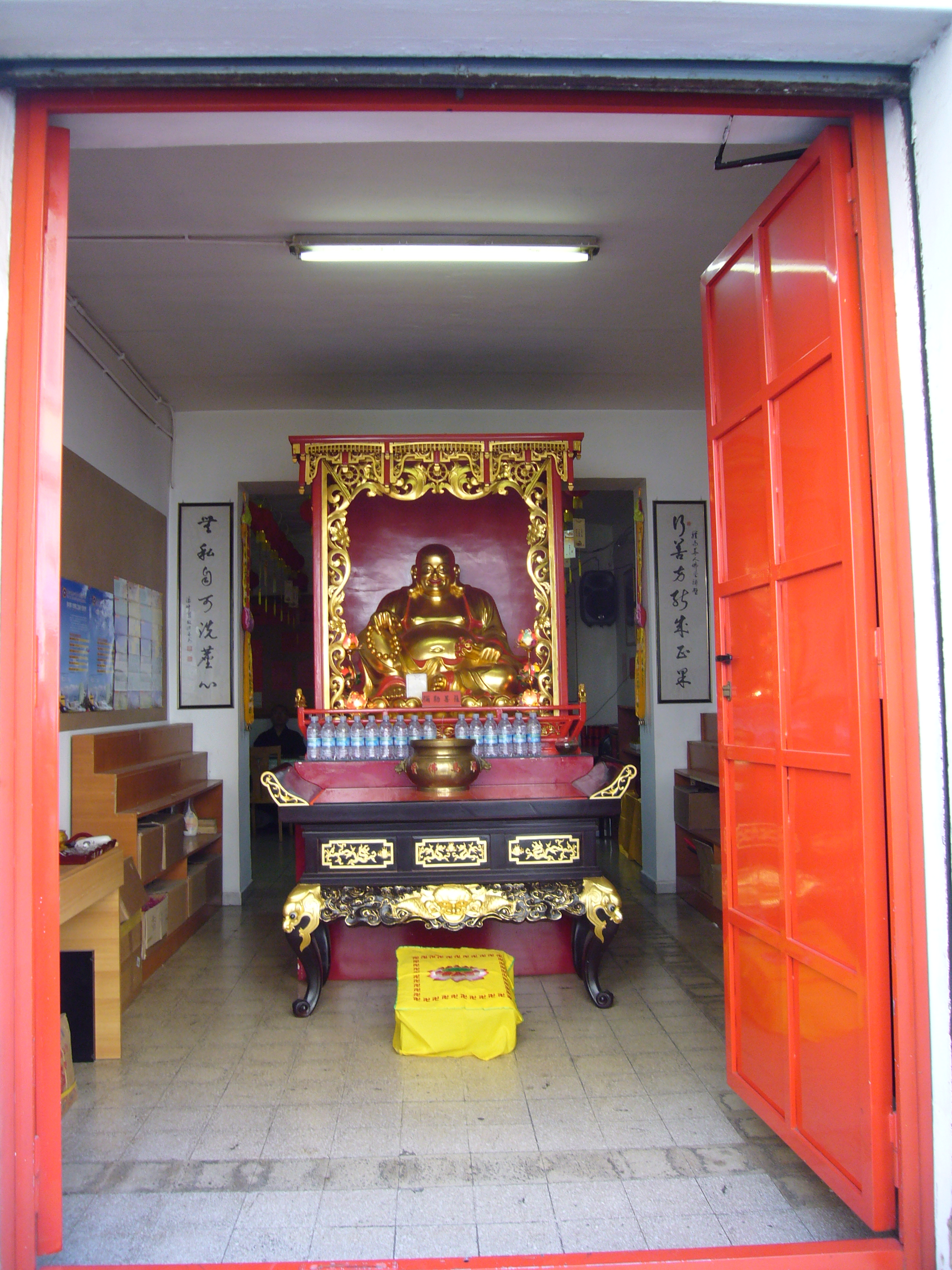
Putuoshan Buddhist temple of the Chinese community in Rome's Chinatown, Esquilino

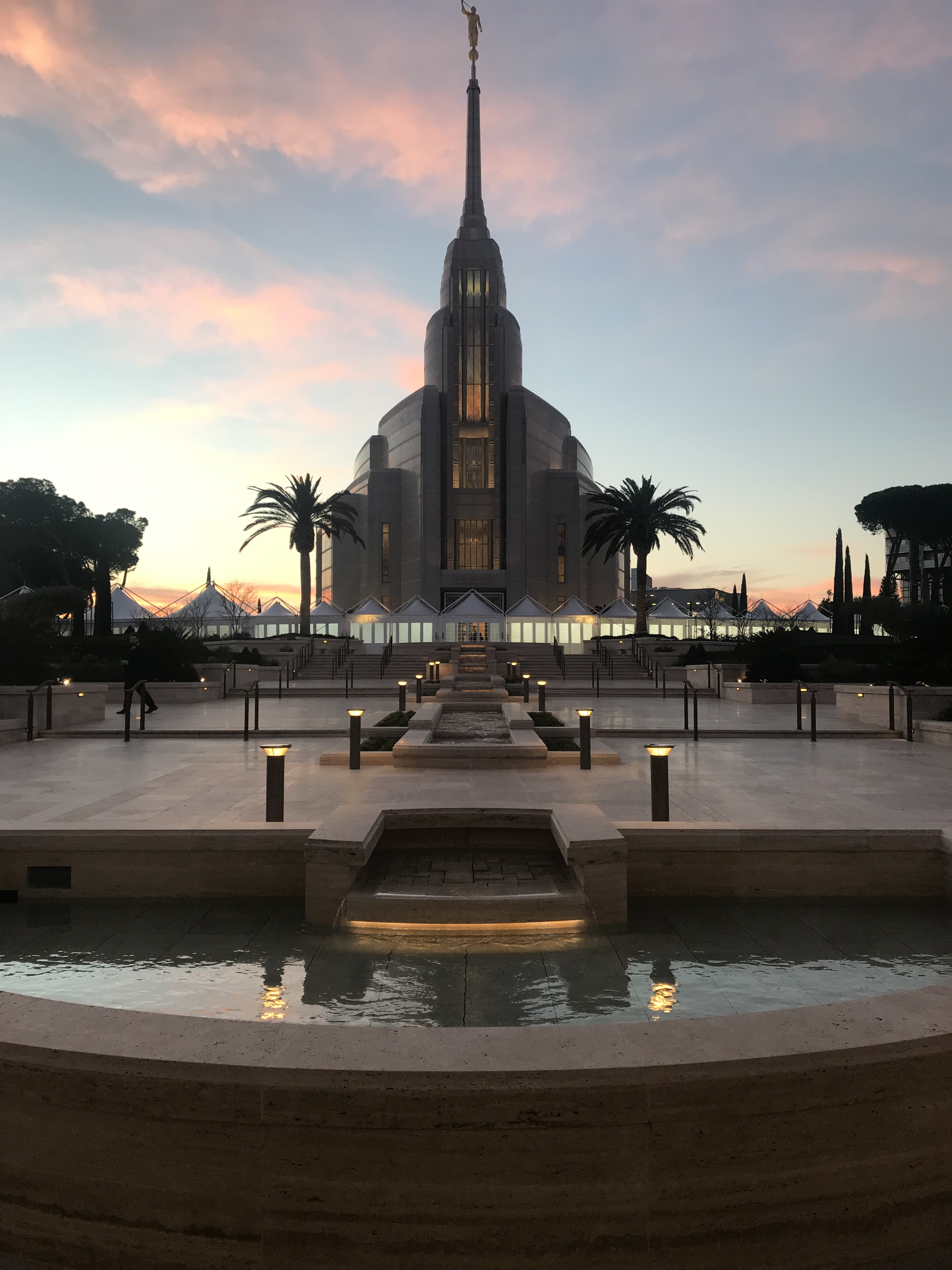
The Rome Mormon Temple of the Church of Jesus Christ of Latter-day Saints

Much like the rest of Italy, Rome is predominantly Roman Catholic. Although Rome is home to the Vatican City and St. Peter's Basilica, Rome's cathedral is the Basilica of St. John Lateran, located to the south-east of the city-centre. There are around 900 churches in Rome in total, aside from the cathedral itself, some others of note include: the Basilica di Santa Maria Maggiore, the Basilica of Saint Paul Outside the Walls, the Basilica di San Clemente, San Carlo alle Quattro Fontane and the Church of the Gesu. There are also the ancient Catacombs of Rome underneath the city. Numerous highly important religious educational institutions are also in Rome, such as the Pontifical Lateran University, Pontifical Biblical Institute, Pontifical Gregorian University, and Pontifical Oriental Institute.

The territory of Vatican City is part of the Mons Vaticanus, and of the adjacent former Vatican Fields, where St. Peter's Basilica, the Apostolic Palace, the Sistine Chapel, and museums were built, along with various other buildings. The area was part of the Roman rione of Borgo until 1929. Being separated from the city, on the west bank of the Tiber river, the area was an outcrop of the city that was protected by being included within the walls of Leo IV, and later expanded by the current fortification walls of Paul III/Pius IV/Urban VIII. When the Lateran Treaty of 1929 that gave the state its present form was being prepared, the boundaries of the proposed territory was influenced by the fact that much of it was all but enclosed by this loop. For some tracts of the frontier, there was no wall, but the line of certain buildings supplied part of the boundary, and for a small part of the frontier a modern wall was constructed.

The territory includes Saint Peter's Square, distinguished from the territory of Italy only by a white line along the limit of the square, where it touches Piazza Pio XII. St. Peter's Square is reached through the Via della Conciliazione, which runs from the Tiber River to St. Peter's. This grand approach was constructed by Benito Mussolini after the conclusion of the Lateran Treaty. According to the Lateran Treaty, certain properties of the Holy See that are located in Italian territory, most notably Castel Gandolfo and the major basilicas, enjoy extraterritorial status similar to that of foreign embassies.

In addition to Catholicism, various world religions are present in Rome, which makes it one of the most important cities in the world for worship and pilgrimage.

A large Jewish community has been present since the late Republican era, in particular in the Roman Ghetto, one of the most important neighborhoods of the city. Judaism has one of the largest synagogues in Europe, the Tempio Maggiore of Rome. The Jewish tradition is very linked to the city of Rome, also linked to the fact that many typical dishes of Roman cuisine are of Jewish tradition, such as Carciofi alla giudia.

Other major religions, there is the Waldensian Evangelical Church with the Waldensian temple in Piazza Cavour, Orthodoxy with the church of Santa Caterina Martire and Mormonism with the temple of Rome Italy.

Rome is home to two Buddhist temples of Chinese culture. The Putuoshan Chinese Buddhist temple in the Esquilino neighborhood, in what is effectively considered the Chinatown of Rome (due to the high concentration of Chinese), in Piazza Vittorio Emanuele II the Chinese New Year is also celebrated every year. The second temple is the Hua Yi Si, opened more recently in 2013, is the largest Chinese Buddhist temple in Europe, located in the eastern suburbs of Rome. Most of the Chinese Buddhists in Rome are faithful of the Chán school.

In recent years, the Islamic community has grown significantly, in great part due to immigration from North African and Middle Eastern countries into the city. As a consequence of this trend, the comune promoted the building of the largest mosque in Europe, in the Parioli district, which was designed by architect Paolo Portoghesi and inaugurated on June 21, 1995.

Finally, the Roman gentiles of the Associazione Tradizionale Pietas have begun erecting temples since the 2000s and every year they carry out public religious functions like the ceremony of the Natale di Roma.

=== Pilgrimage ===
Rome has been a major Christian pilgrimage site since the Middle Ages. People from all over the Christian world visit Vatican City, the seat of the papacy, which is entirely within the city of Rome. The Pope was the most influential figure during the Middle Ages, and even today he remains one of the most powerful and influential figures in the world according to Forbes. The city became a major pilgrimage site during the Middle Ages and the focus of struggles between the Papacy and the Holy Roman Empire starting with Charlemagne, who was crowned its first emperor in Rome in 800 by Pope Leo III. Catholics believe that the Vatican is the last resting place of St. Peter. to this day, thousand of believers flock to the city to Rome. One of the pilgrimage stopping point is pilate's stairs where, according to the Christian tradition, the steps that led up to the praetorium of Pontius Pilate in Jerusalem, which Jesus Christ stood on during his Passion on his way to trial. The stairs were, reputedly, brought to Rome by St. Helena in the 4th Century. For centuries, the Scala Santa has attracted Christian pilgrims who wished to honour the Passion of Jesus.

== Tourism ==
Rome today is one of the most popular tourist destinations of the world, due to the size of its archaeological, artistic and historical heritage. Among the most significant places are the numerous museums – (Musei Capitolini, the Vatican Museums, Galleria Borghese) – aqueducts, fountains, churches, palaces, historical buildings, the monuments and ruins of the Roman Forum, and the Catacombs. Rome is the 3rd most visited city in the EU, after London and Paris, and receives an average of 7–10 million tourists a year, which sometimes doubles on holy years. The Colosseum (4 million tourists) and the Vatican Museums (4.2 million tourists) are the 39th and 37th (respectively) most visited places in the world, according to a 2009 study.

Rome is a major archaeological hub, and one of the world's main centres of archaeological research. There are numerous cultural and research institutes located in the city, such as the American Academy in Rome, and The Swedish Institute at Rome, to name a few. Rome contains numerous ancient sites, including the Forum Romanum, Trajan's Market, Trajan's Forum, Ostia Antica, the Colosseum, and the Pantheon, to name but a few. The Colosseum, arguably one of Rome's most iconic archaeological sites, is regarded as a wonder of the world.

Internal view of the Colosseum

Rome has a growing stock of contemporary and modern art and architecture. The National Gallery of Modern Art has works by Balla, Morandi, Pirandello, Carrà, De Chirico, De Pisis, Guttuso, Fontana, Burri, Mastroianni, Turcato, Kandisky, Cézanne on permanent exhibition. 2010 sees the opening of Rome's newest arts foundation, a contemporary art and architecture gallery designed by acclaimed Iraqi architect Zaha Hadid. Known as MAXXI – National Museum of the 21st Century Arts it restores a dilapidated area with striking modern architecture. Maxxi features a campus dedicated to culture, experimental research laboratories, international exchange and study and research. It is one of Rome's most ambitious modern architecture projects alongside Renzo Piano's Auditorium Parco della Musica and Massimiliano Fuksas' Rome Convention Center, Centro Congressi Italia EUR, in the EUR district, due to open in 2011. The Convention Centre features a huge translucent container inside which is suspended a steel and teflon structure resembling a cloud and which contains meeting rooms and an auditorium with two piazzas open to the neighbourhood on either side.

== Fashion ==
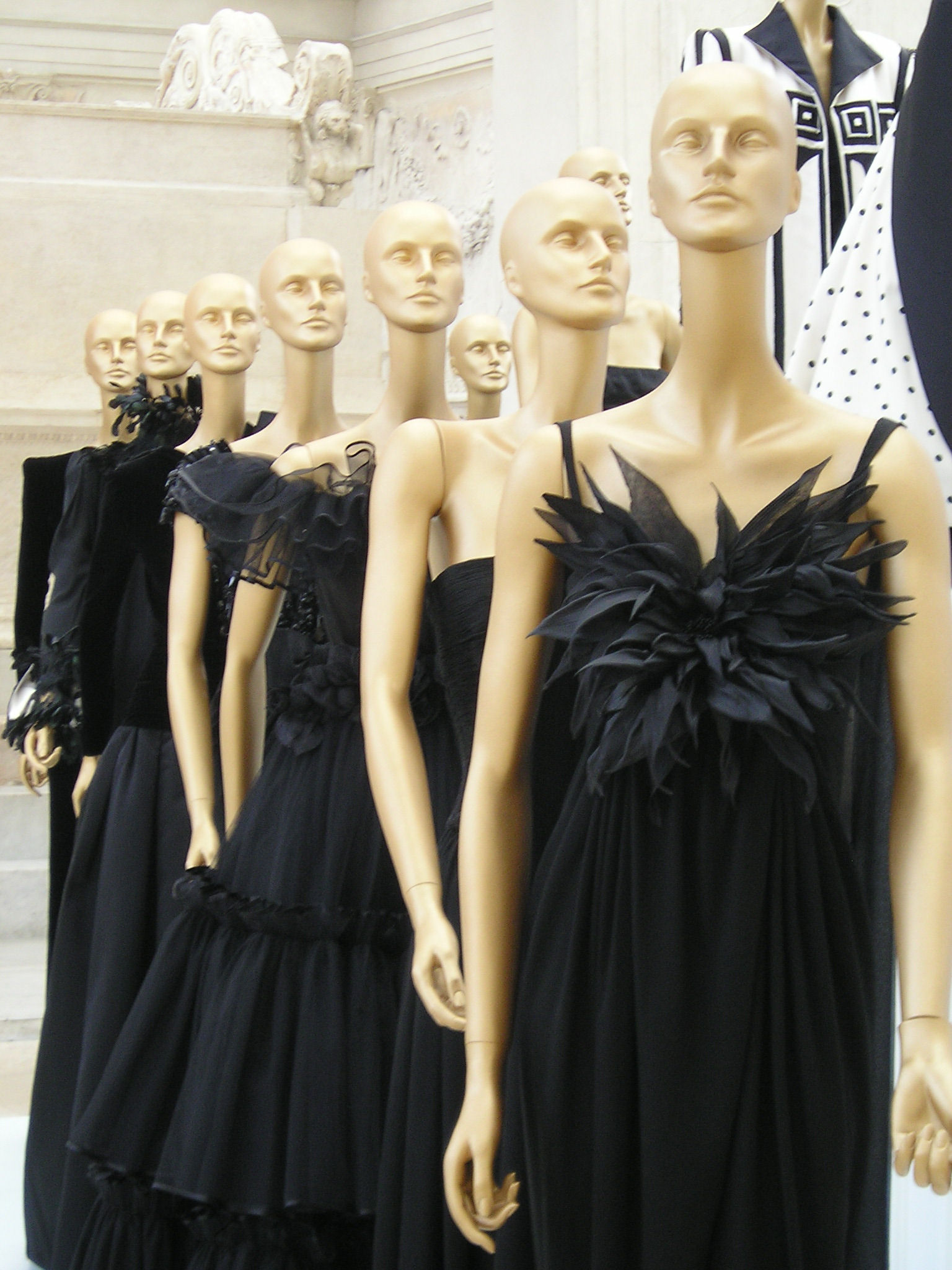
A collection of black dresses by Valentino at the exhibition "Valentino a Roma" at the Museum of the Ara Pacis in Rome

Rome is one of the world's fashion capitals. Major luxury fashion houses and jewellery chains, including Bulgari, Fendi, Laura Biagiotti, Brioni, Gattinoni, Renato Balestra, are headquartered in the city, or were founded there, and other major labels, including Gucci, Chanel, Prada, Dolce & Gabbana, Armani and Versace have luxury boutiques in Rome, primarily on Via dei Condotti, one of the most expensive street in Europe.

Rome's tradition and connection with high fashion dates back to 1871, with the proclamation of the city as the capital of the country and the establishment of the Savoy court, with the consequent arrival of new tailors and the birth of elegant ateliers.

The period of the Dolce Vita and the Italian economic boom caused glamor to explode in the city: against the backdrop of the Trevi Fountain, Spanish Steps and Via Veneto, dresses with precious fabrics and details, worn by the divas of the silver screen, muses of Italian masterpieces and American blockbusters filmed in the Cinecittà Studios.

== Media ==
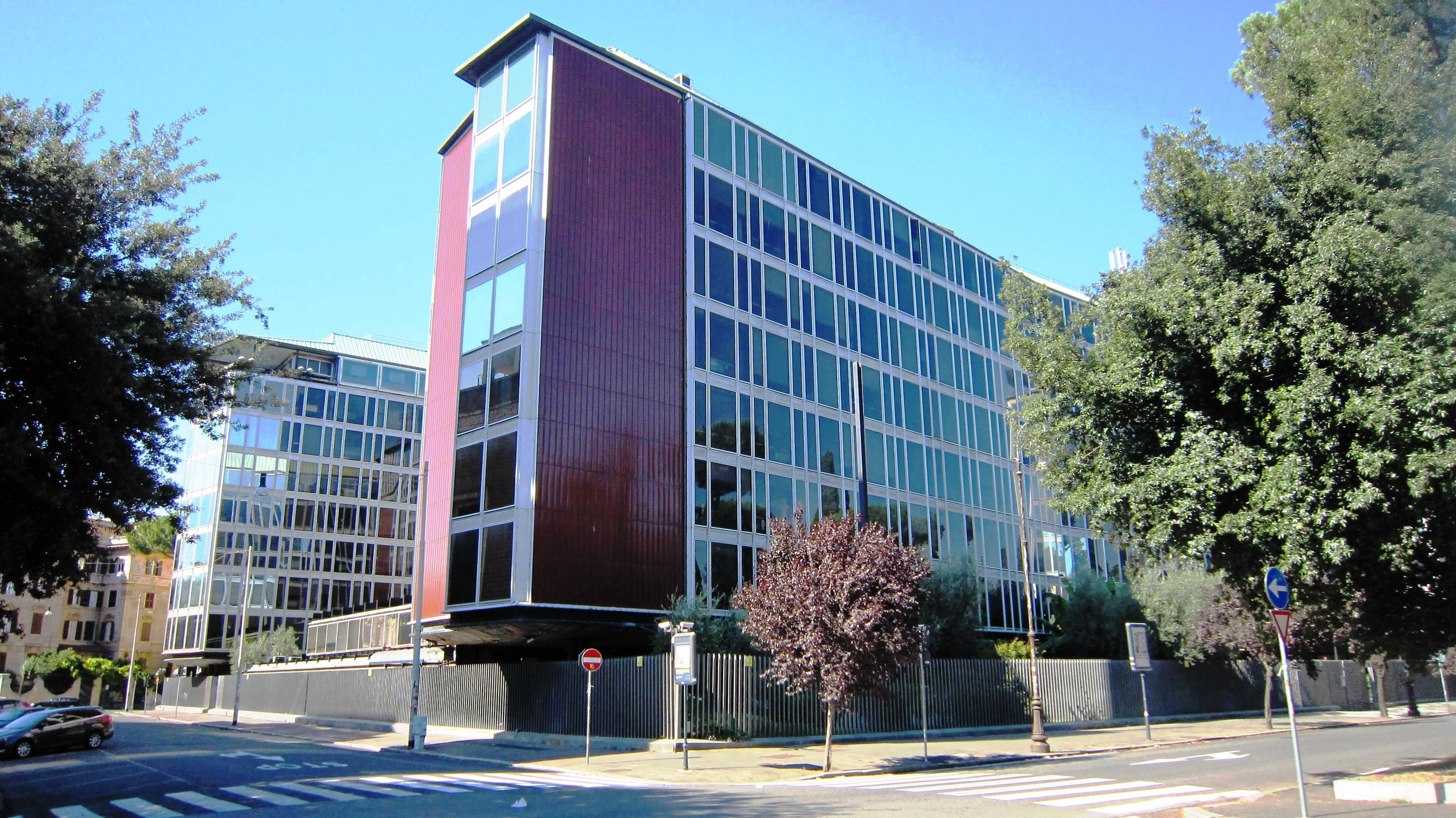
RAI headquarters Viale Mazzini, Rome

The first newspaper printed in Rome was the Diario Ordinario, established by the Chracas family in 1716, marking the beginning of regular news publications in the town. Before its establishment in 1716, other newspapers printed in the Papal States were already circulating in Rome.

Rome is one of the most important media centers at a national and international level. Many of the most popular national newspapers such as La Repubblica, Il Messaggero, Il Tempo, Il Foglio, Il Fatto Quotidiano, Secolo d'Italia, il manifesto and the news magazine L'Espresso have their central editorial offices in the city. Is home to the main Italian news agencies such as ANSA, one of the largest in the world, Adnkronos, AGI and askanews. Sports newspapers such as Corriere dello Sport and free newspapers like Leggo. Also Treccani, Italian Encyclopedia of Science, Letters, and Arts, is based in Rome.

It is the headquarters of RAI, Italy's national public broadcasting. It is the first television hub in Italy and one of the largest communications companies in Europe. Owned by the Ministry of Economy and Finance, RAI manages numerous terrestrial and subscription television and radio channels.

Rome also hosts two Mediaset production centers (the Safa Palatino Studios and the Titanus Elios Studios). La7, one of the largest Italian television companies, is also based in the city.

Most of the Italian national news programs are broadcast from the television studios in Rome: TG1, TG2, TG3, TG5, TG La7 and Rai News 24.

Among the Italian radio stations with national distribution, Radio Capital, M2o, Radio Dimensione Suono, Radio Maria and Rai Radio are based in Rome with 10 radio networks.

Many of the largest mass media multinationals operating in Italy, such as Netflix, Warner Bros., NBCUniversal and A&E Networks have their Italian operational headquarters in Rome.

== Cuisine ==
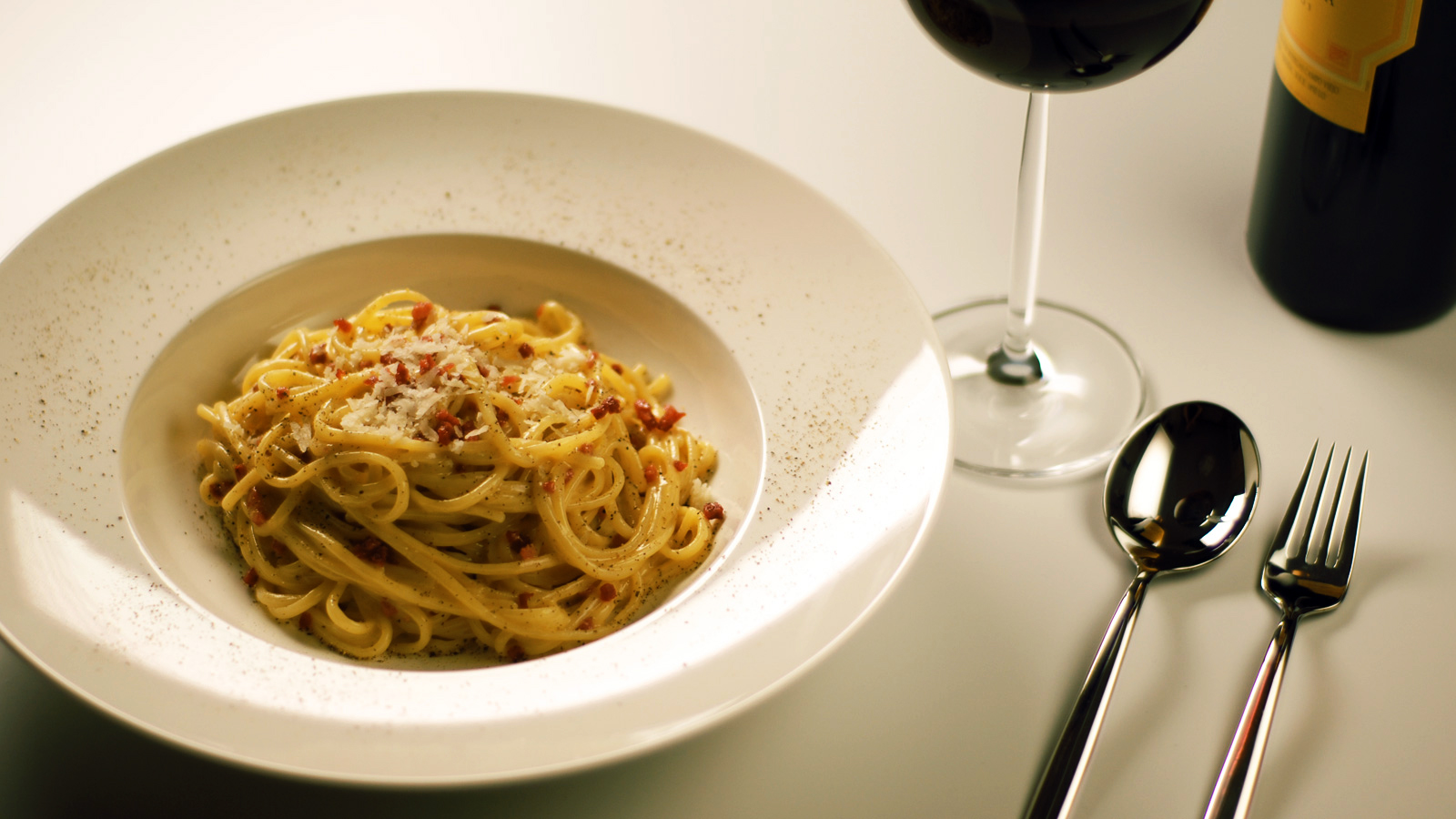
Spaghetti alla Carbonara, a typical Roman dish

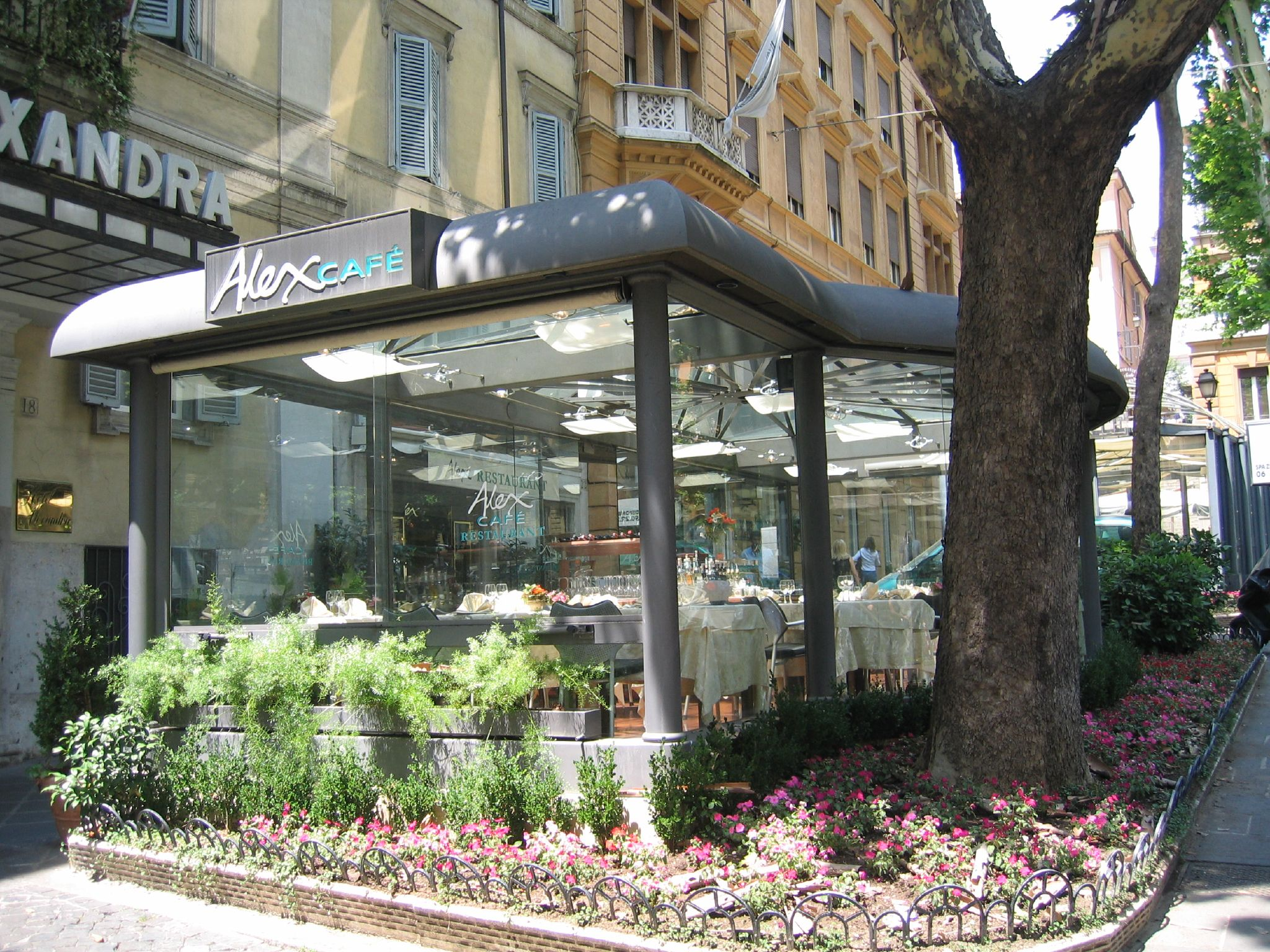
A typical sidewalk café on Via Veneto

Rome's cuisine has evolved through centuries and periods of social, cultural, and political changes. Rome became a major gastronomical centre during Ancient Rome. Ancient Roman Cuisine was highly influenced by Ancient Greek culture, and after, the empire's enormous expansion exposed Romans to many new, provincial culinary habits and cooking techniques. In the beginning, the differences between social classes were not very great, but disparities developed with the empire's growth. Later, during the Renaissance, Rome became well known as a centre of high-cuisine, since some of the best chefs of the time, worked for the popes. An example of this could be Bartolomeo Scappi, who was a chef, working for Pius IV in the Vatican kitchen, and he acquired fame in 1570 when his cookbook Opera dell'arte del cucinare was published. In the book he lists approximately 1000 recipes of the Renaissance cuisine and describes cooking techniques and tools, giving the first known picture of a fork. Today, the city is home to numerous formidable and traditional Italian dishes. A Jewish influence can be seen, as Jews have lived in Rome since the 1st century BCE. Vegetables, especially globe artichokes, are common. Examples of these include "Saltimbocca alla Romana" – a veal cutlet, Roman-style; topped with raw ham and sage and simmered with white wine and butter; "Carciofi alla giudia" – artichokes fried in olive oil, typical of Roman Jewish cooking; "Carciofi alla romana" – artichokes Roman-style; outer leaves removed, stuffed with mint, garlic, breadcrumbs and braised; "Spaghetti alla carbonara" – spaghetti with bacon, eggs and pecorino, and "Gnocchi di semolino alla romana" – semolina dumpling, Roman-style, to name but a few.

== Sports ==
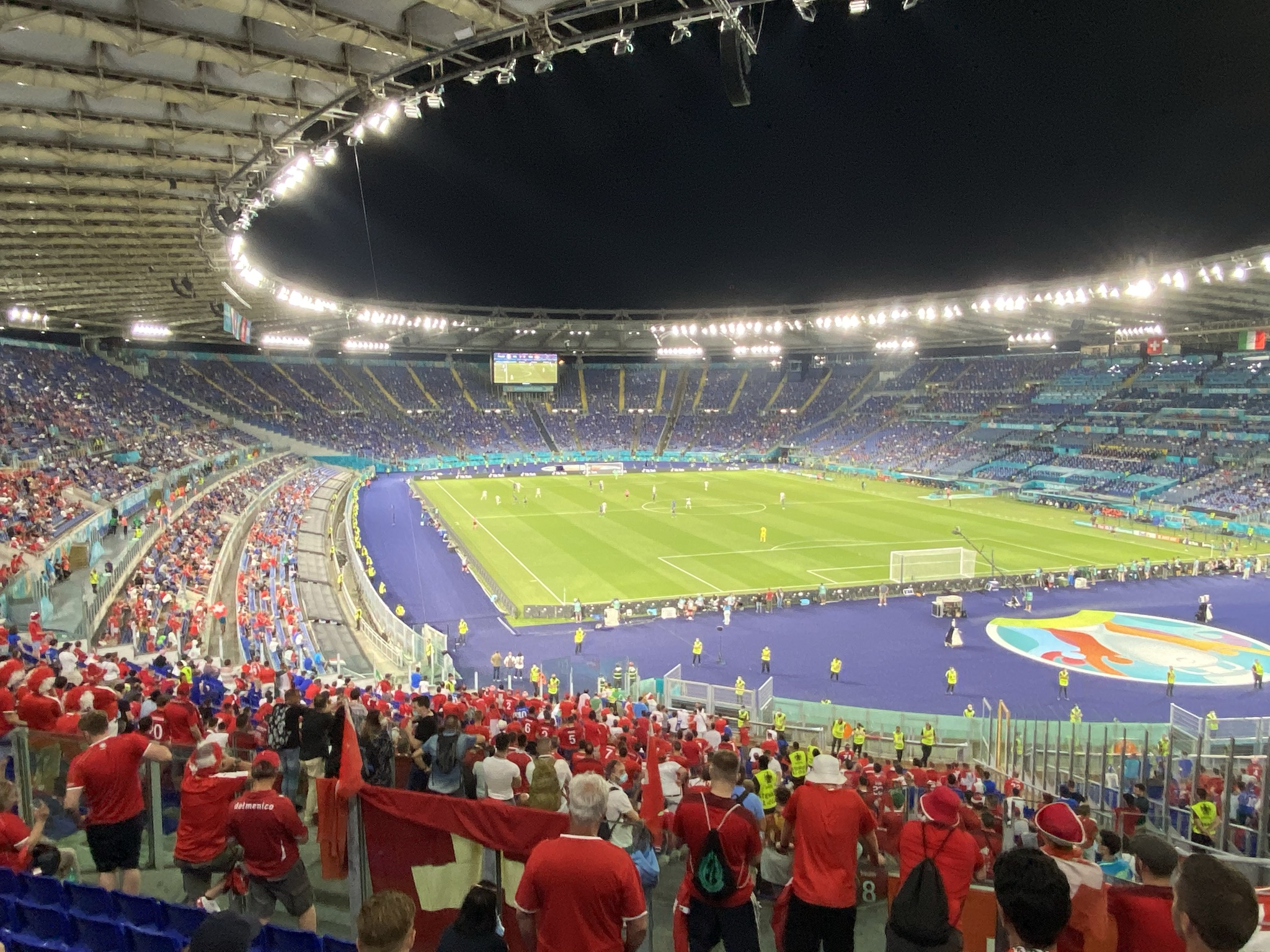
Stadio Olimpico during UEFA Euro 2020, one of the largest in Europe, with a capacity of over 70,000.

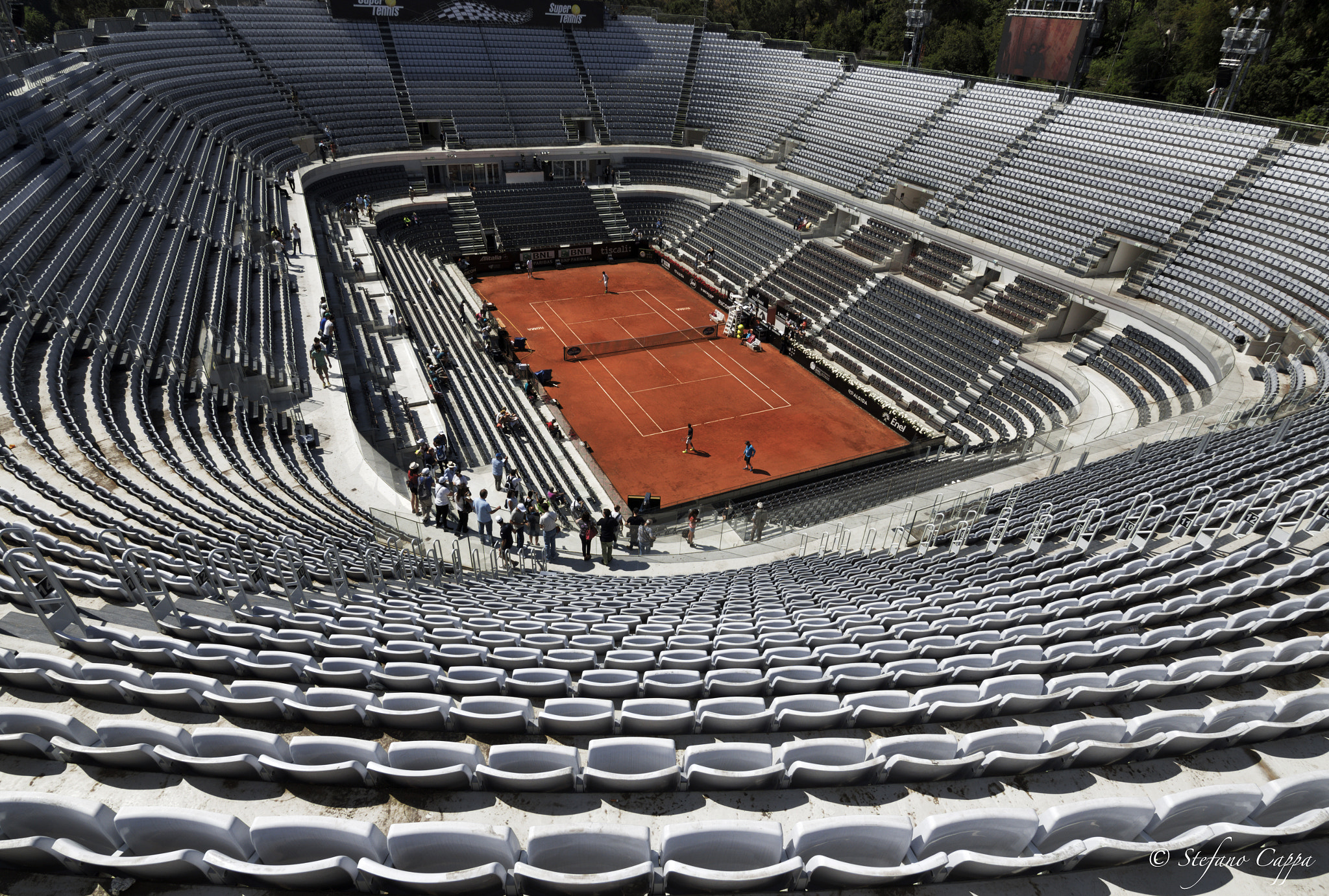
Stadio Centrale at Foro Italico, opened in 2010, is the main court of the Italian Open

Football (soccer) is the most popular sport in Rome, as in the rest of the country. The city hosted the final games of the 1934 and 1990 FIFA World Cup. The latter took place in the Stadio Olimpico, which is also the home stadium for local Serie A clubs A.S. Roma and S.S. Lazio, whose rivalry has become a staple of Roman sports culture. Footballers who play for these teams and are also born in the city tend to become especially popular, as has been the case with players such as Francesco Totti and Daniele De Rossi (both for A.S. Roma).

Rome hosted the 1960 Summer Olympics using ancient sites such as the Villa Borghese and the Thermae of Caracalla as venues. For the Olympic Games new structures were created, notably the new large Olympic Stadium (which was also enlarged and renewed to host qualification and the final match of the 1990 FIFA World Cup), the Villaggio Olimpico (Olympic Village, created to host the athletes and redeveloped after the games as a residential district), etc.

The Stadio Olimpico is also the home stadium for the Italy national rugby union team, which has been playing in the Six Nations Championship since 2000. Rome is home to local rugby teams, such as Unione Rugby Capitolina, Rugby Roma, and S.S. Lazio Rugby 1927. And it is home to many other sports teams, including basketball (Virtus Roma), volleyball (M. Roma Volley), handball and water polo.

Every year the city of Rome is the home of many international sporting events:

- Every May, Rome hosts the tennis tournament ATP Masters Series on the clay courts of the Foro Italico;
- International horse show "Piazza di Siena", equestrian competition held since 1922 in piazza di Siena, inside Villa Borghese;
- Golden Gala Pietro Mennea international event of athletics which takes place annually at the Stadio Olimpico;
- Every March it organizes the Rome Marathon, with departure and arrival in Via dei Fori Imperiali.

Also Cycling was popular in the post-World War II period. Rome has often hosted the final part of the Giro d'Italia.

== Education ==
=== Universities ===
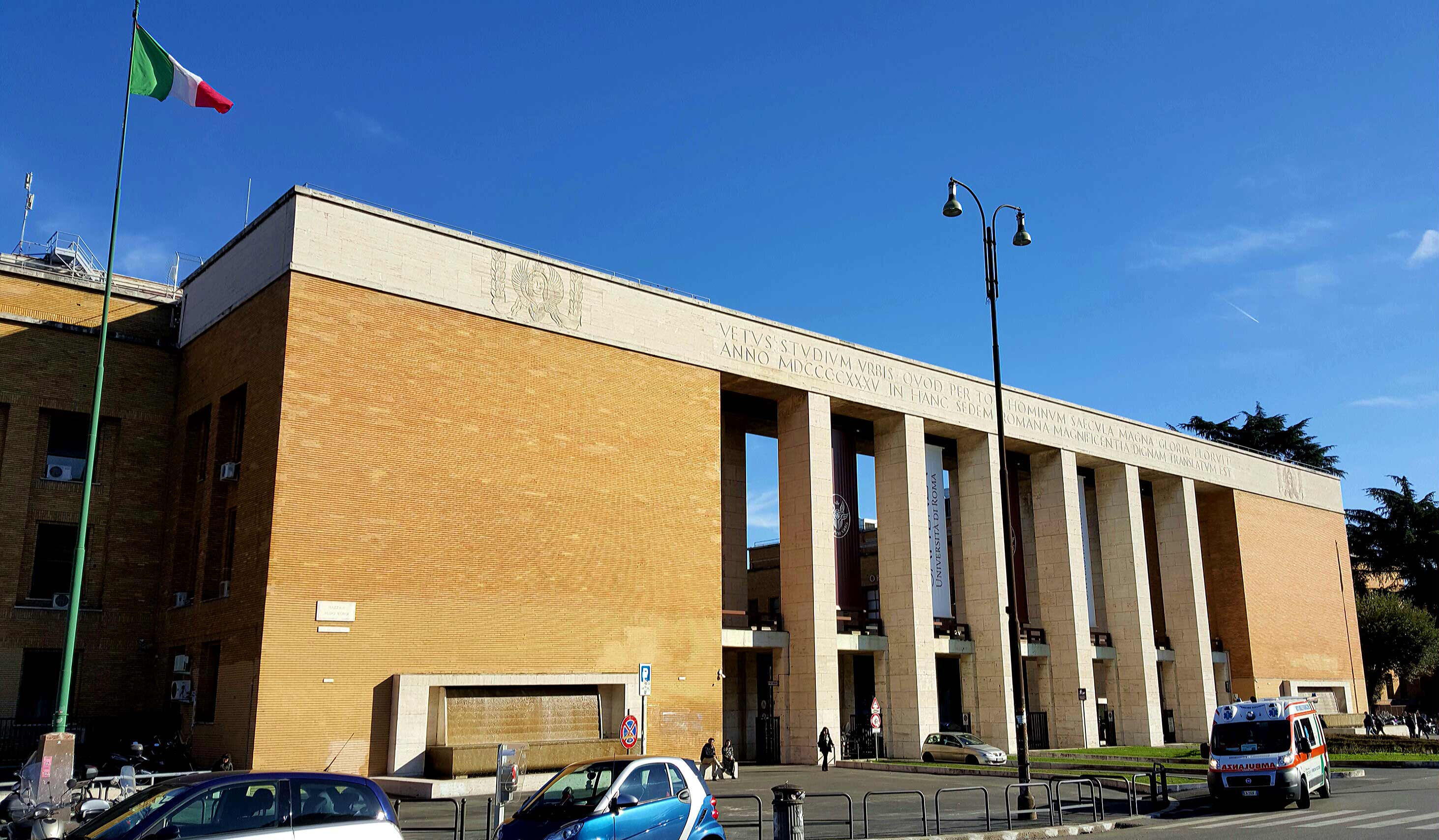
The "Città Universitaria" of Rome, home to the main Roman university, Sapienza, built on an urban planning project by Marcello Piacentini and inaugurated in 1935

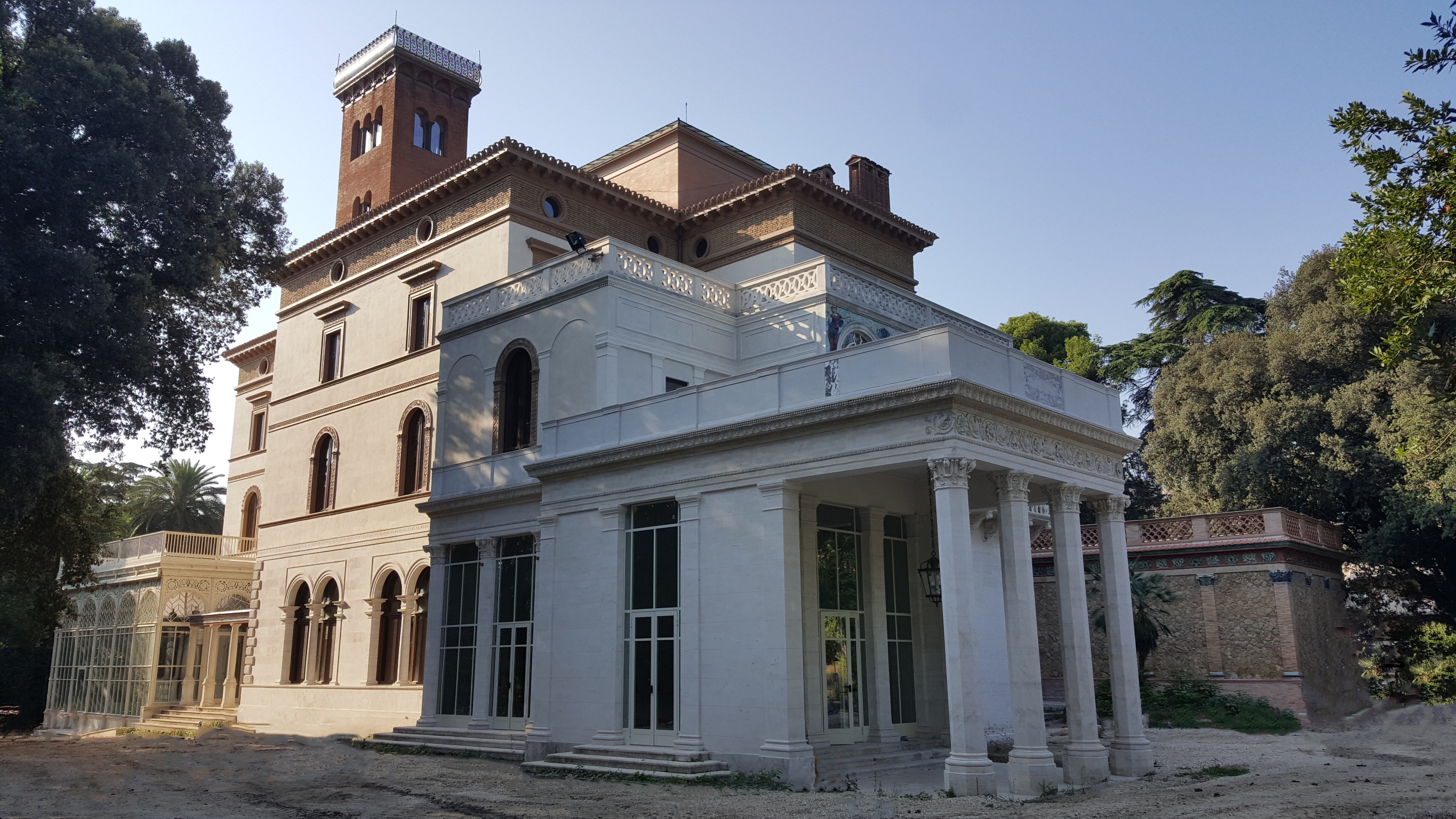
Libera Università Internazionale degli Studi Sociali Guido Carli

The city's first university, La Sapienza, was founded in 1303. Two further large public universities were founded in the late 20th century: Tor Vergata in 1982, and Roma Tre in 1992; today each has around 38,000 students. Also state-supported is IUSM, a vocational university with 2000 students located in the Foro Italico district and dedicated exclusively to sports and movement sciences.

A large number of pontifical universities and institutes are located in Rome, including the Pontifical Gregorian University, founded in 1551 and the oldest Jesuit university in the world, and the Pontifical University of St. Thomas Aquinas (the ‘Angelicum’) which represents the ongoing Dominican scholastic tradition established by St. Dominic and St. Thomas Aquinas.

The city is also home to a number of private universities. The Libera Università Maria SS. Assunta (LUMSA) is a Catholic institution founded in 1939. LUISS, founded in 1966, has faculties of Economics, Law and Political Science. The Università Campus Bio-Medico is a small Catholic university which focusses on medicine, nursing and biomedical engineering. The Libera Università degli Studi San Pio V, founded in 1966, has faculties of Economics, Foreign Languages and Literature, and Political Sciences. There are also Roman centres of the Milanese Università Cattolica del Sacro Cuore and of the Istituto Europeo di Design, a design school founded in Milan in 1966 which now has a presence in eight cities and two continents.

Foreign universities based in Rome include The American University of Rome and the John Cabot University: private American liberal arts institutions founded in 1969 and 1972 respectively The Link Campus is an international university initially constituted as the Italian branch of the University of Malta. Also present are St. John's University, a branch of St. John's University in New York City and the John Felice Rome Center, of Loyola University Chicago.

== Healthcare ==
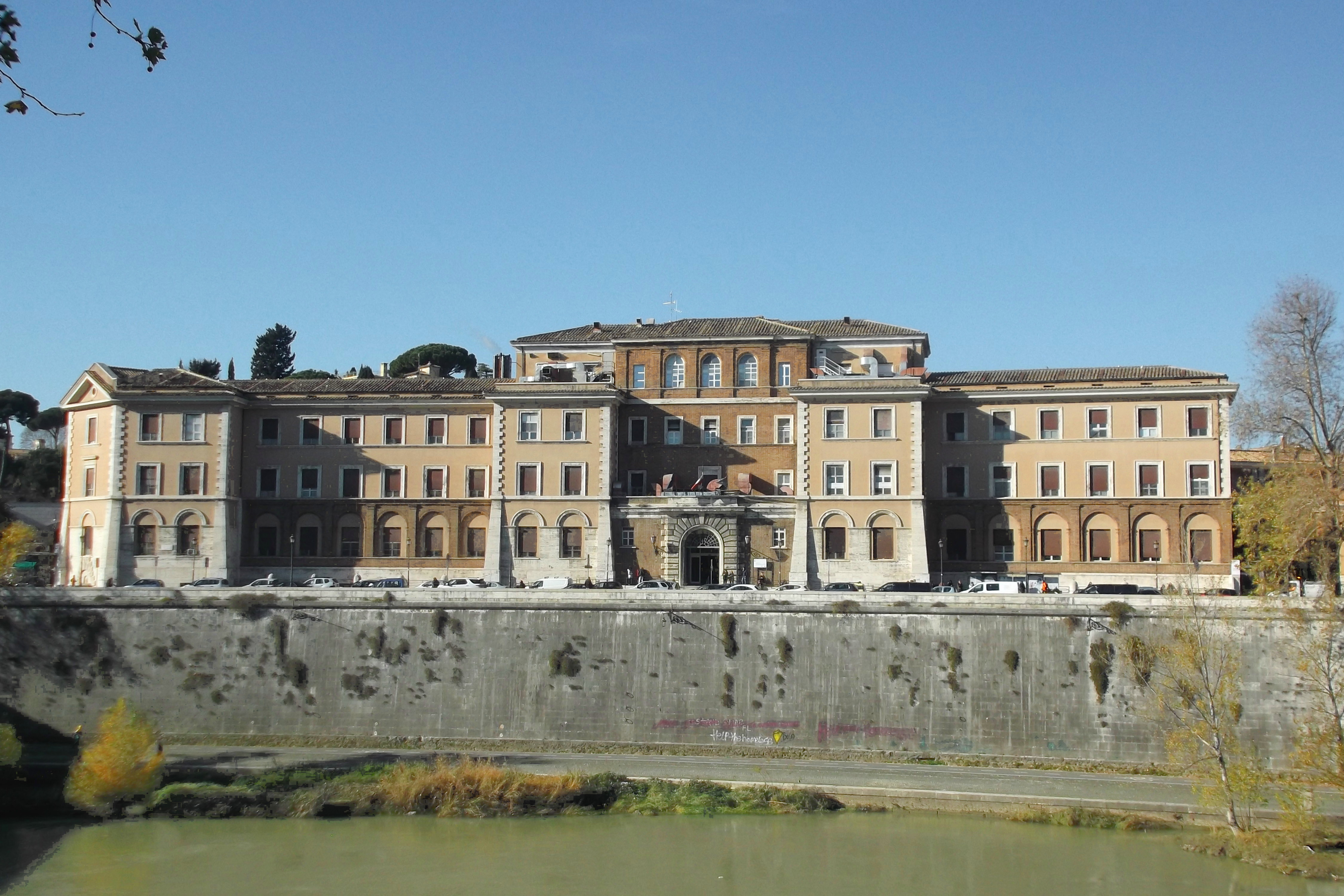
Front view of the most recent building of the Ospedale di Santo Spirito in Sassia, the oldest hospital in Europe.

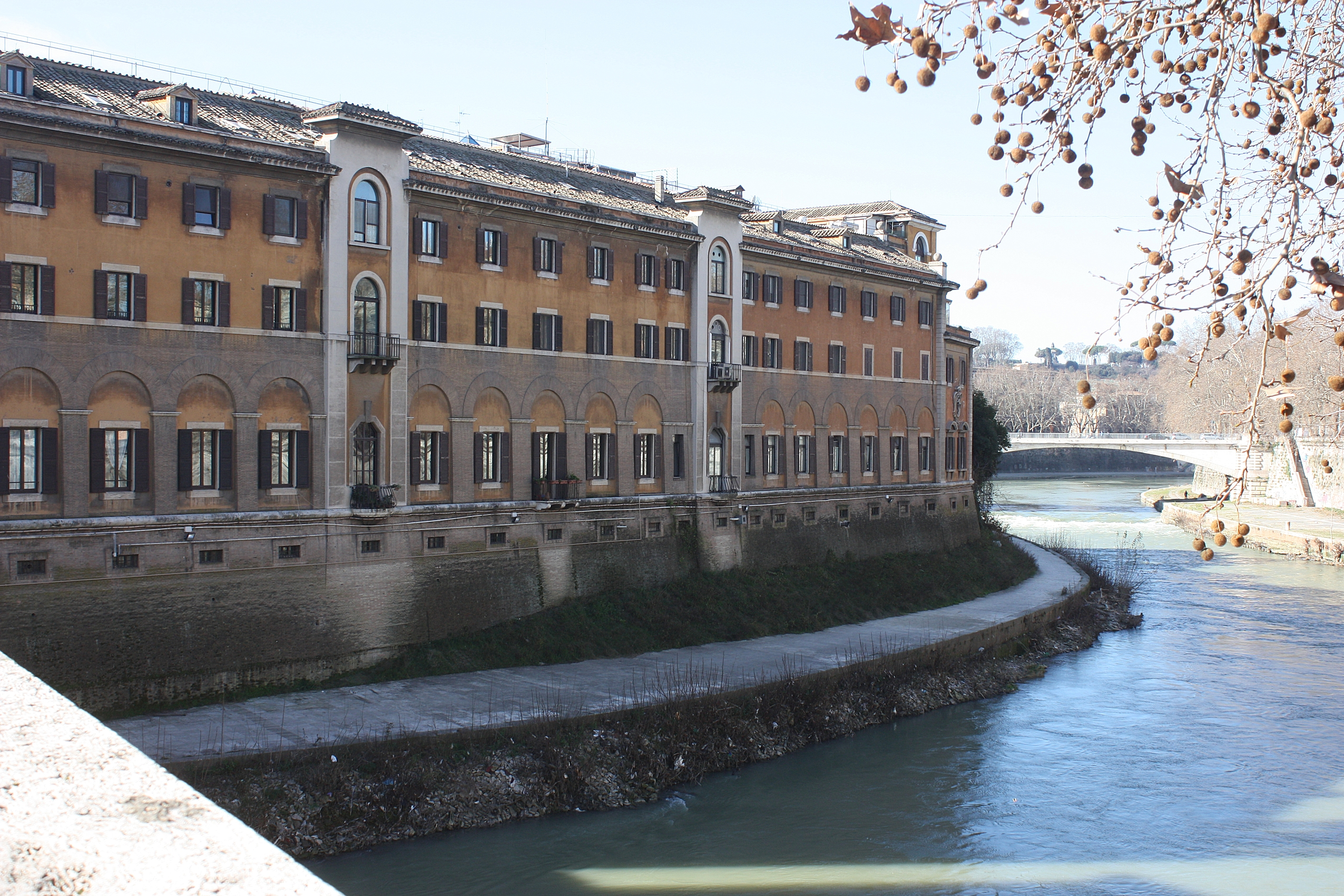
Fatebenefratelli Hospital on Tiber Island. On this small island on the Tiber, under the Latin name Æsculapius, a Roman temple was built in 291 BC, where similar rites and treatments were performed. This makes it one of the earliest testimonies of hospital history.

Health care and emergency medical service in the City of Rome and its suburbs are provided by the Servizio Sanitario Nazionale (SSN). In Italy it employs 617,246 people, the healthcare facilities in Italy and Rome are divided into Local Health Authorities (ASL), Hospitals, University Hospitals integrated with the SSN, Hospitals integrated with Universities.

Rome is home to some of the main public and private hospitals in the country, an organizational chart that includes: Agostino Gemelli University Policlinic, known for having repeatedly treated famous patients such as Pope John Paul II and Pope Francis, Policlinico Umberto I, Bambino Gesù Hospital, Fatebenefratelli Hospital, Lazzaro Spallanzani National Institute for Infectious Diseases, San Giovanni Addolorata Hospital, Ospedale di Santo Spirito in Sassia, Tor Vergata Polyclinic, Campus Bio-Medico, Casilino Polyclinic, Sant'Eugenio Hospital, Sant'Andrea Hospital, San Filippo Neri Hospital, San Camillo-Forlanini Hospital, Sandro Pertini Hospital, San Carlo di Nancy Hospital etc.

Italian healthcare is managed by the Italian regions, each region has its own healthcare system which reports to the national healthcare system (SSN). The regional system of Lazio provides various structures to which one can turn for various specialized socio-health services, through the "Case della Salute", a network of health structures spread across the territory.
