= Lazio =

Region of Italy

Coordinates: 41°54′N 12°43′E

Lazio Latium
- Region
- Flag Coat of arms

- Country: Italy
- Capital: Rome

Government
  - Type: Presidential system
  - Body: Regional Cabinet
  - President: Francesco Rocca
  - Legislature: Regional Council

Area
  - Total: 17,232.29 km^{2} (6,653.42 sq mi)

Population (2026)
  - Total: 5,709,444
  - Rank: 2nd in Italy
  - Density: 331.3224/km^{2} (858.1211/sq mi)
- Demonym(s): English: Lazian; Italian: Laziale

Languages
  - Official: Italian

GDP
  - Total: €246.487 billion (2024)
  - Per capita: €43,175 (2024)
- Time zone: UTC+1 (CET)
  - Summer (DST): UTC+2 (CEST)
- ISO 3166 code: IT-62
- HDI (2023): 0.938 very high · 3rd of 21
- NUTS Region: ITE
- Website: www.regione.lazio.it

Lazio (UK: /ˈlætsioʊ/ LAT-see-oh, US: /ˈlɑːt-/ LAHT-; Italian: [ˈlattsjo]) or Latium (/ˈleɪʃiəm/ LAY-shee-əm, US also /-ʃəm/ -shəm; from the original Latin name, pronounced [ˈɫati.ũː]) is one of the 20 administrative regions of Italy. Situated in the central peninsular section of the country, it has 5,709,444 inhabitants and a GDP of more than €212 billion per year, making it the country's second most populated region and second largest regional economy after Lombardy. The capital of Lazio is Rome, which is also the capital city of Italy.

Lazio was the home of the Etruscan civilization, then stood at the center of the Roman Republic, of the Roman Empire, of the Papal States, of the Kingdom of Italy and of the Italian Republic. Lazio boasts a rich cultural heritage. Great artists and historical figures lived and worked in Rome, particularly during the Italian Renaissance period.

In remote antiquity, Lazio (Latium) included only a limited part of the current region, between the lower course of the Tiber, the Tyrrhenian Sea, the Monti Sabini and the Pontine Marshes.

After the end of World War II in Europe and the fall of the Fascist regime Lazio and Italy saw rapid economic growth, especially in Rome. Today, Lazio is a large center of services and international trade, industry, public services, and tourism, supported by an extensive network of transport infrastructures thanks to its geographical position in the center of Italian Peninsula and the presence of Rome within it.

== History ==
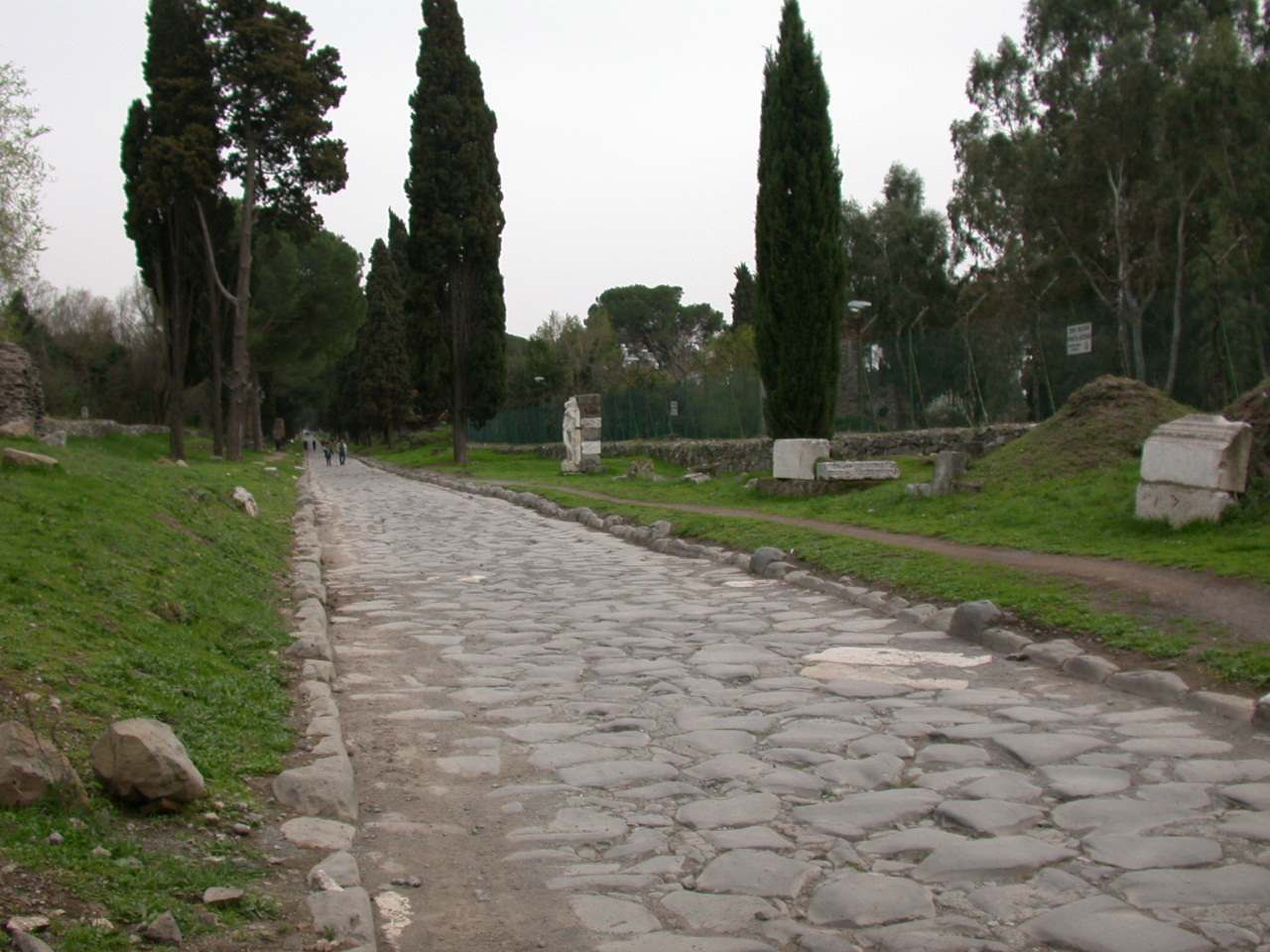
The Appian Way (Via Appia), a road connecting Ancient Rome to the southern parts of Italy, remains usable even today.

The Italian word Lazio descends from the Latin word Latium, the region of the Latins, Latini in the Latin language spoken by them and passed on to the Latin city-state of Ancient Rome. Although the demography of ancient Rome was multi-ethnic, including, for example, Etruscans, Sabines and other Italics besides the Latini, the latter were the dominant constituent. In Roman mythology, the tribe of the Latini took their name from King Latinus. Apart from the mythical derivation of Lazio given by the ancients as the place where Saturn, ruler of the golden age in Latium, hid (latuisset) from Jupiter there, a major modern etymology is that Lazio comes from the Latin word "latus", meaning "wide", expressing the idea of "flat land" meaning the Roman Campagna. Much of Lazio is in fact flat or rolling. The lands originally inhabited by the Latini were extended into the territories of the Samnites, the Marsi, the Hernici, the Aequi, the Aurunci and the Volsci, all surrounding Italic tribes. This larger territory was still called Latium, but it was divided into Latium adiectum or Latium Novum, the added lands or New Latium, and Latium Vetus, or Old Latium, the older, smaller region. The northern border of Lazio was the Tiber river, which divided it from Etruria.

The emperor Augustus officially united almost all of present-day Italy into a single geo-political entity, Italia, dividing it into eleven regions. The part of today's Lazio south of the Tiber river – together with the present region of Campania immediately to the southeast of Lazio and the seat of Neapolis – became Region I (Latium et Campania), while modern Upper Lazio became part of Regio VII – Etruria, and today's Province of Rieti joined Regio IV – Samnium.

After the Gothic conquest of Italy at the end of the fifth century, modern Lazio became part of the Ostrogothic Kingdom, but after the Gothic War between 535 and 554 and conquest by the Byzantine Empire, the region became the property of the Eastern Emperor as the Duchy of Rome. However, the long wars against the Longobards weakened the region. With the Donation of Sutri in 728, the Pope acquired the first territory in the region beyond the Duchy of Rome.

The strengthening of the religious and ecclesiastical aristocracy led to continuous power struggles between secular lords (Baroni) and the Pope until the middle of the 16th century. Innocent III tried to strengthen his own territorial power, wishing to assert his authority in the provincial administrations of Tuscia, Campagna and Marittima through the Church's representatives, in order to reduce the power of the Colonna family. Other popes tried to do the same. During the period when the papacy resided in Avignon, France (1309–1377), the feudal lords' power increased due to the absence of the Pope from Rome. Small communes, and Rome above all, opposed the lords' increasing power, and with Cola di Rienzo, they tried to present themselves as antagonists of the ecclesiastical power. However, between 1353 and 1367, the papacy regained control of Lazio and the rest of the Papal States. From the middle of the 16th century, the papacy politically unified Lazio with the Papal States, so that these territories became provincial administrations of St. Peter's estate; governors in Viterbo, in Marittima and Campagna, and in Frosinone administered them for the papacy.

Lazio was part of the short-lived Roman Republic, after which it became a puppet state of the French First Republic under the forces of Napoleon Bonaparte. Lazio was returned to the Papal States in October 1799. In 1809, it was annexed to the French Empire under the name of the Department of Tibre, but returned to the Pope's control in 1815.

On 20 September 1870 the capture of Rome, during the reign of Pope Pius IX, and France's defeat at Sedan, completed Italian unification, and Lazio was incorporated into the Kingdom of Italy. In 1927, the territory of the province of Rieti, belonging to Umbria and Abruzzo, joined Lazio. Towns in Lazio were devastated by the 2016 Central Italy earthquake.

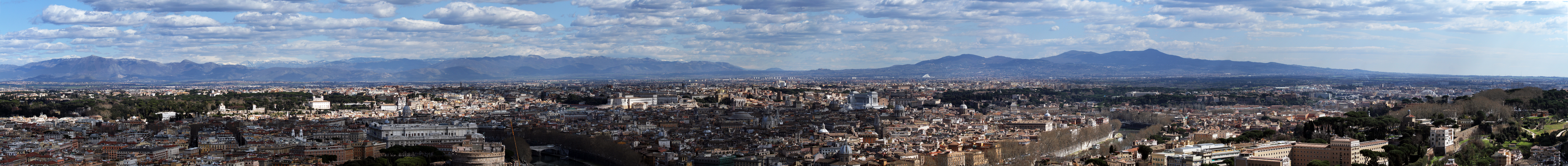
Panoramic view of Rome from St. Peter's Basilica (Vatican City)

== Geography ==
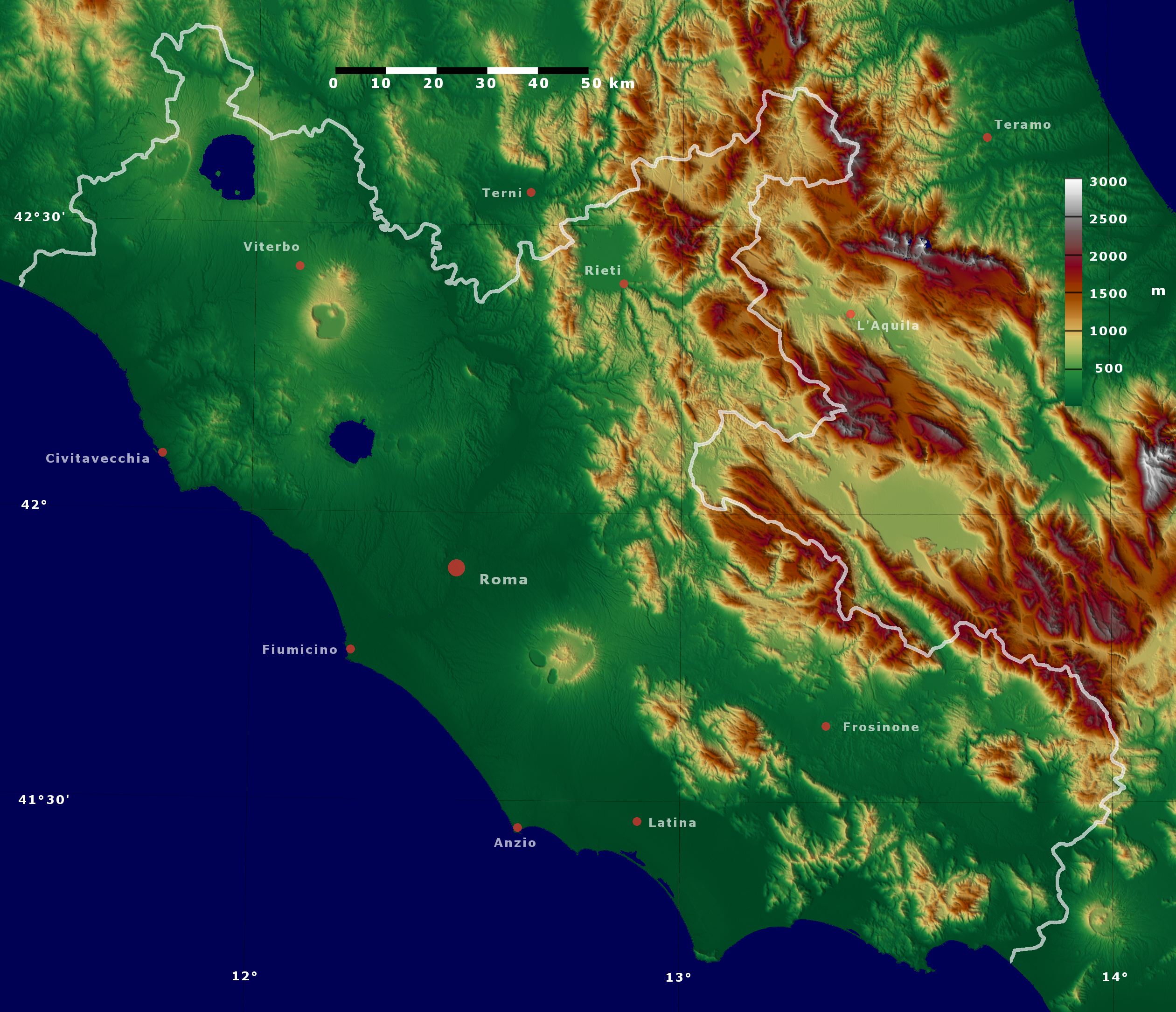
Relief map of Lazio

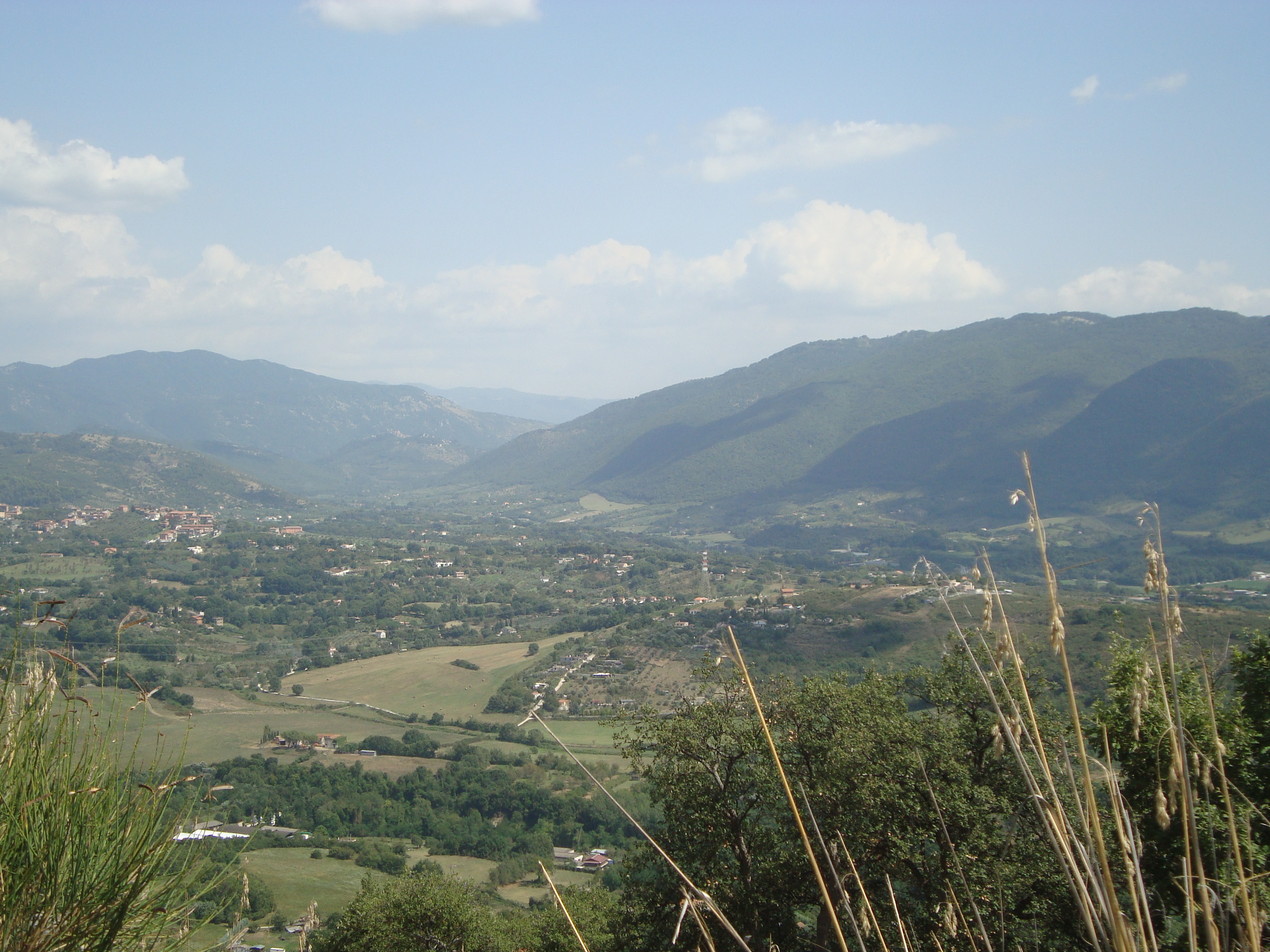
Panorama of the Aniene Valley

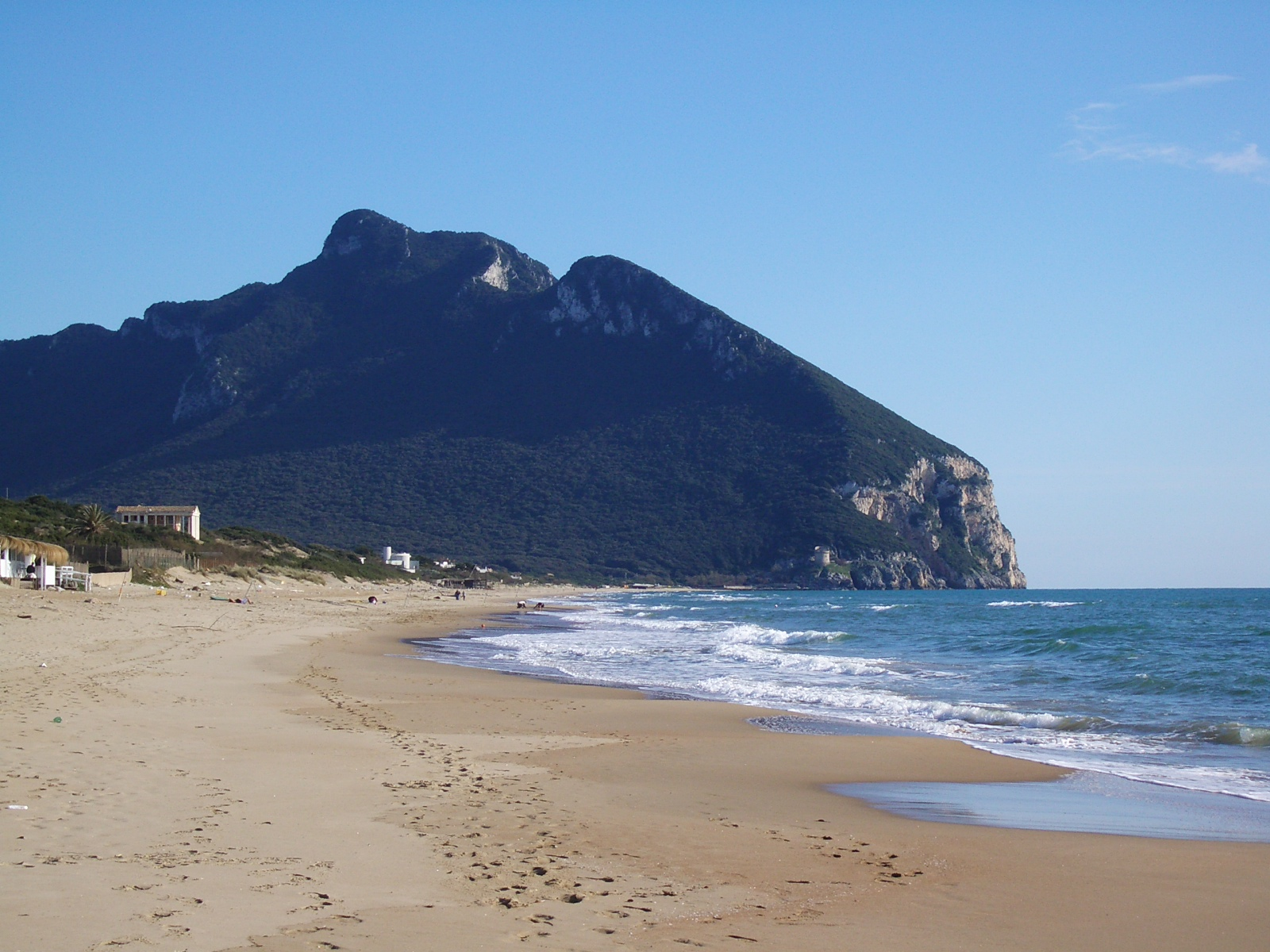
The Circeo National Park seen from Sabaudia beach

Lazio comprises a land area of 17,242 km^{2} (6,657 sq mi) and it has borders with Tuscany, Umbria, and Marche to the north, Abruzzo and Molise to the east, Campania to the south, and the Tyrrhenian Sea to the west. The region is mainly hilly (56%) and mountainous (26%), with some plains (20%) along the coast and the Tiber valley.

The coast of Lazio is mainly composed of sandy beaches, punctuated by the headlands of Cape Circeo (541 m) and Gaeta (171 m). The Pontine Islands, which are part of Lazio, are off Lazio's southern coast. Behind the coastal strip, to the north, lies the Maremma Laziale (the continuation of the Tuscan Maremma), a coastal plain interrupted at Civitavecchia by the Tolfa Mountains (616 m). The central section of the region is occupied by the Roman Campagna, a vast alluvial plain surrounding the city of Rome, with an area of approximately 2,100 km^{2} (811 sq mi). The southern districts are characterized by the flatlands of Agro Pontino, a once swampy and malarial area, that was reclaimed over the centuries.

The Preapennines of Latium, marked by the Tiber Valley and the Liri with the Sacco tributary, include on the right of the Tiber, three groups of mountains of volcanic origin: the Volsini, Cimini and Sabatini, whose largest former craters are occupied by the Bolsena, Vico and Bracciano lakes. To the south of the Tiber, other mountain groups form part of the Preapennines: the Alban Hills, also of volcanic origin, and the calcareous Lepini, Ausoni and Aurunci Mountains. The Apennines of Latium are a continuation of the Apennines of Abruzzo: the Reatini Mountains with Terminillo (2,213 m), Mounts Sabini, Prenestini, Simbruini and Ernici which continue east of the Liri into the Mainarde Mountains. The highest peak is Mount Gorzano (2,458 m) on the border with Abruzzo.

=== Climate ===
The region's climate has considerable variability from area to area. In general, along the coast, there is a Mediterranean climate, the temperature values vary between 9–10 °C (48–50 °F) in January and 24–25 °C (75–77 °F) in July. Towards the interior, the climate is more continental and, on the hills, winters are cold and at night, temperatures can be quite frigid. Among the regional capital cities in Italy, Rome is the one with the highest number of hours of sunshine and days with clear skies during the year.

== Demographics ==
Historical population
Year	Pop.	±%
1861	355,682	—
1871	1,173,065	+229.8%
1881	1,256,876	+7.1%
1901	1,585,907	+26.2%
1911	1,770,869	+11.7%
1921	1,997,045	+12.8%
1931	2,348,699	+17.6%
1936	2,654,924	+13.0%
1951	3,340,798	+25.8%
1961	3,958,957	+18.5%
1971	4,689,482	+18.5%
1981	5,001,684	+6.7%
1991	5,140,371	+2.8%
2001	5,112,413	−0.5%
2011	5,502,886	+7.6%
2021	5,714,882	+3.9%
Source: ISTAT

As of 2026, the population is 5,709,444, of which 48.6% are male, and 51.4% are female. Children make up 14.6% of the population, and elderly make up 24.3%.

The overall population density in the region is 331.3 inhabitants per km^{2}, higher than the national average of 195.1. However, the provincial population density widely ranges from 787.1 in the highly urbanized Metropolitan City of Rome to 54.3 in the mountainous and rural province of Rieti.

=== Immigration ===
As of 2025, immigrants make up 13.1% of the population. The five most popular countries of origin are: Romania, Bangladesh, the Philippines, India, and Ukraine.

=== Largest cities ===
Largest cities or towns in Lazio Source: ISTAT - 1 January 2026
Rank		Province	Pop.	Rank		Province	Pop.
1	Rome	Rome	2,745,062	11	Ardea	Rome	51,374
2	Latina	Latina	127,450	12	Civitavecchia	Rome	51,359
3	Guidonia Montecelio	Rome	89,420	13	Nettuno	Rome	48,111
4	Fiumicino	Rome	83,415	14	Marino	Rome	46,667
5	Aprilia	Latina	74,697	15	Terracina	Latina	45,055
6	Viterbo	Viterbo	66,767	16	Rieti	Rieti	44,866
7	Pomezia	Rome	64,970	17	Frosinone	Frosinone	42,836
8	Anzio	Rome	60,063	18	Monterotondo	Rome	41,185
9	Tivoli	Rome	55,321	19	Ladispoli	Rome	40,968
10	Velletri	Rome	53,048	20	Fondi	Latina	40,310

Foreign population by country of birth (2025)
Country of birth	Population
Romania	158,002
Bangladesh	44,319
Philippines	37,472
India	32,282
Ukraine	29,348
Albania	28,461
Egypt	23,325
Peru	20,908
China	18,363
Poland	17,761
Moldova	17,693
Morocco	16,273
Brazil	13,899
France	12,597
Germany	12,289

== Government and politics ==
Lazio has a system of representative democracy in which the President of the Region (Presidente della Regione) is the head of government and of a pluriform multi-party system. Executive power is vested in the regional government (Giunta Regionale) and legislative power is vested in the Regional Council (Consiglio Regionale).

Rome is centre-left politically oriented by tradition, while the rest of Lazio is centre-right oriented. In the 2008 general election, Lazio gave 44.2% of its vote to the centre-right coalition, while the centre-left block took 41.4% of vote. In the 2013 general election, Lazio gave 40.7% of its vote to the centre-left block coalition, 29.3% to the centre-right coalition and 20.2 to the Five Star Movement.

The current president of Lazio is Francesco Rocca, independent politician and former president of the International Federation of Red Cross and Red Crescent Societies, in office in the centre-right coalition.

=== Administrative divisions ===
Lazio is divided into four provinces and one metropolitan (province-level) city:

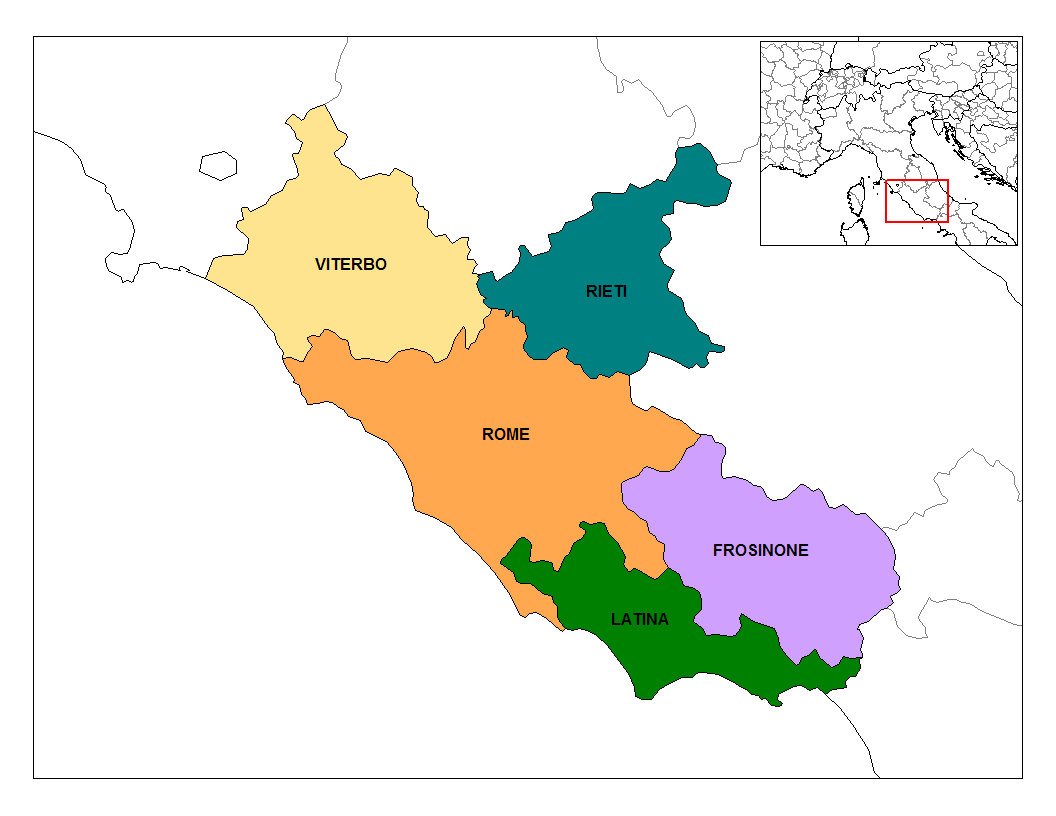

Province	Population (2026)	Area (km^{2})	Density (inh./km^{2})	Municipalities
Province of Frosinone	460,266	3,247.08	141.7	91
Province of Latina	567,130	2,256.16	251.4	33
Province of Rieti	149,335	2,750.52	54.3	73
Metropolitan City of Rome Capital	4,224,901	5,363.28	787.7	121
Province of Viterbo	307,812	3,615.24	85.1	60

== Economy ==
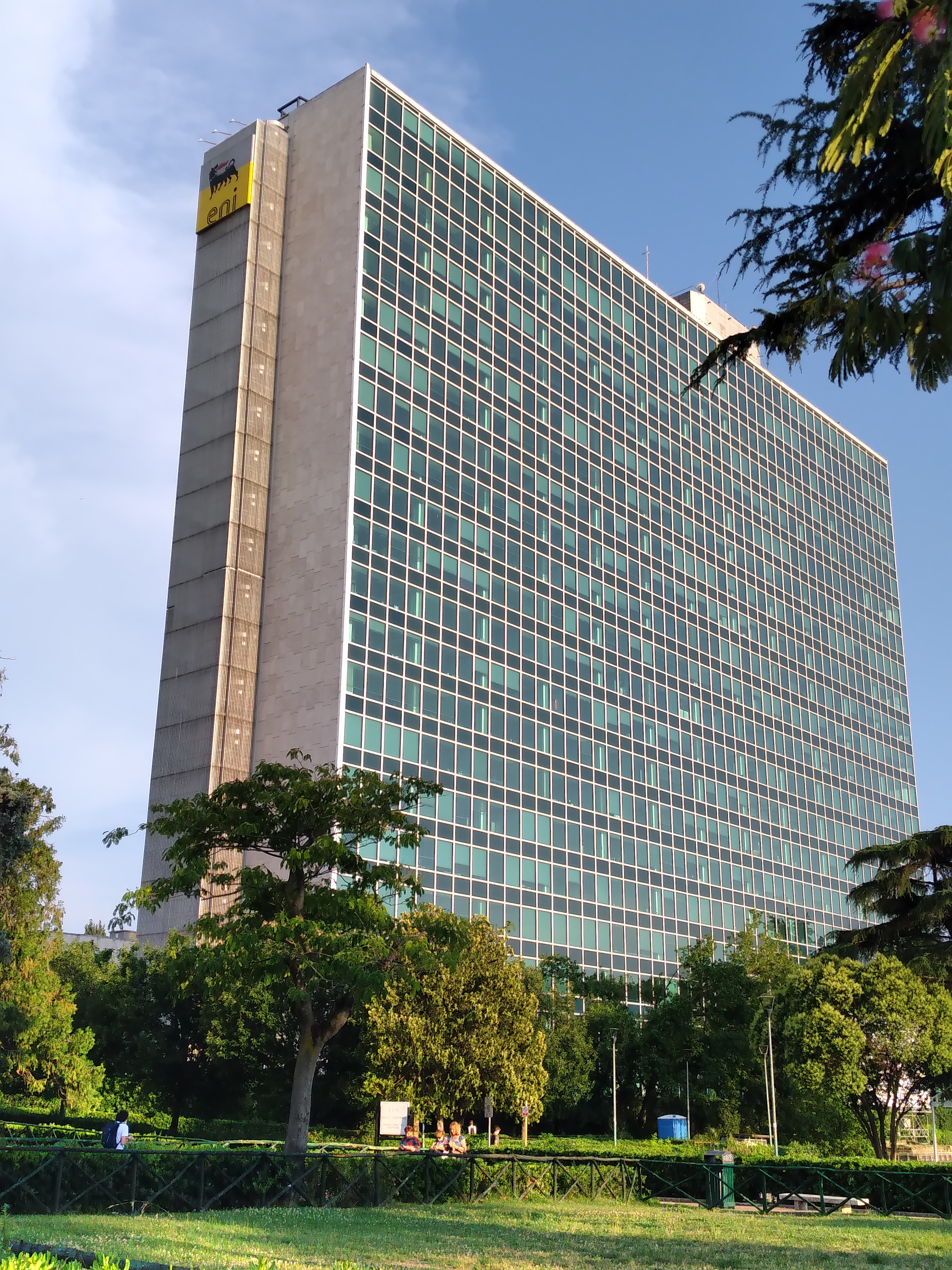
Headquarters of Eni in EUR, Rome

Agriculture, crafts, animal husbandry and fishery are the main traditional sources of income. Agriculture is characterized by the cultivation of wine grapes, fruit, vegetables and olives. Lazio is the main growing region of kiwifruit in Italy.

Approximately 73% of the working population are employed in the services sector, which contribute 85.8% of regional GDP; this is a considerable proportion, but is justified by the presence of Rome, which is the core of public administration, media, utility, telecommunication, transport, tourism and other sectors. Many national and multinational corporations, public and private, have their headquarters in Rome (ENI, Italiana Petroli, Enel, Acea, Terna, TIM, Poste Italiane, Leonardo, ITA Airways, Ferrovie dello Stato Italiane, RAI).

Lazio's limited industrial sector and highly developed service industries allowed the region to well outperform the Italian economy during the 2008 financial crisis and the Great Recession, but it was strongly affected by the COVID-19 lockdowns.

Industrial development in Lazio is limited to the areas south of Rome. Communications and – above all – the setting of the border of the Cassa del Mezzogiorno some kilometers south of Rome have influenced the position of industry, favouring the areas with the best links to Rome and those near the Autostrada del Sole, especially around Frosinone. Additional factor was cheap energy supply from Latina Nuclear Power Plant and Garigliano Nuclear Power Plant, which are now out of operation after the Italian nuclear energy referendum.

Lazio is served by Rome Fiumicino Airport. The airport is the busiest airport in the country, the eighth-busiest airport in Europe and the world's 39th-busiest airport with over 49.2 million passengers served in 2024. Rome Ciampino Airport is the region's second international airport and is mainly serving low-cost carriers.

=== Industry ===
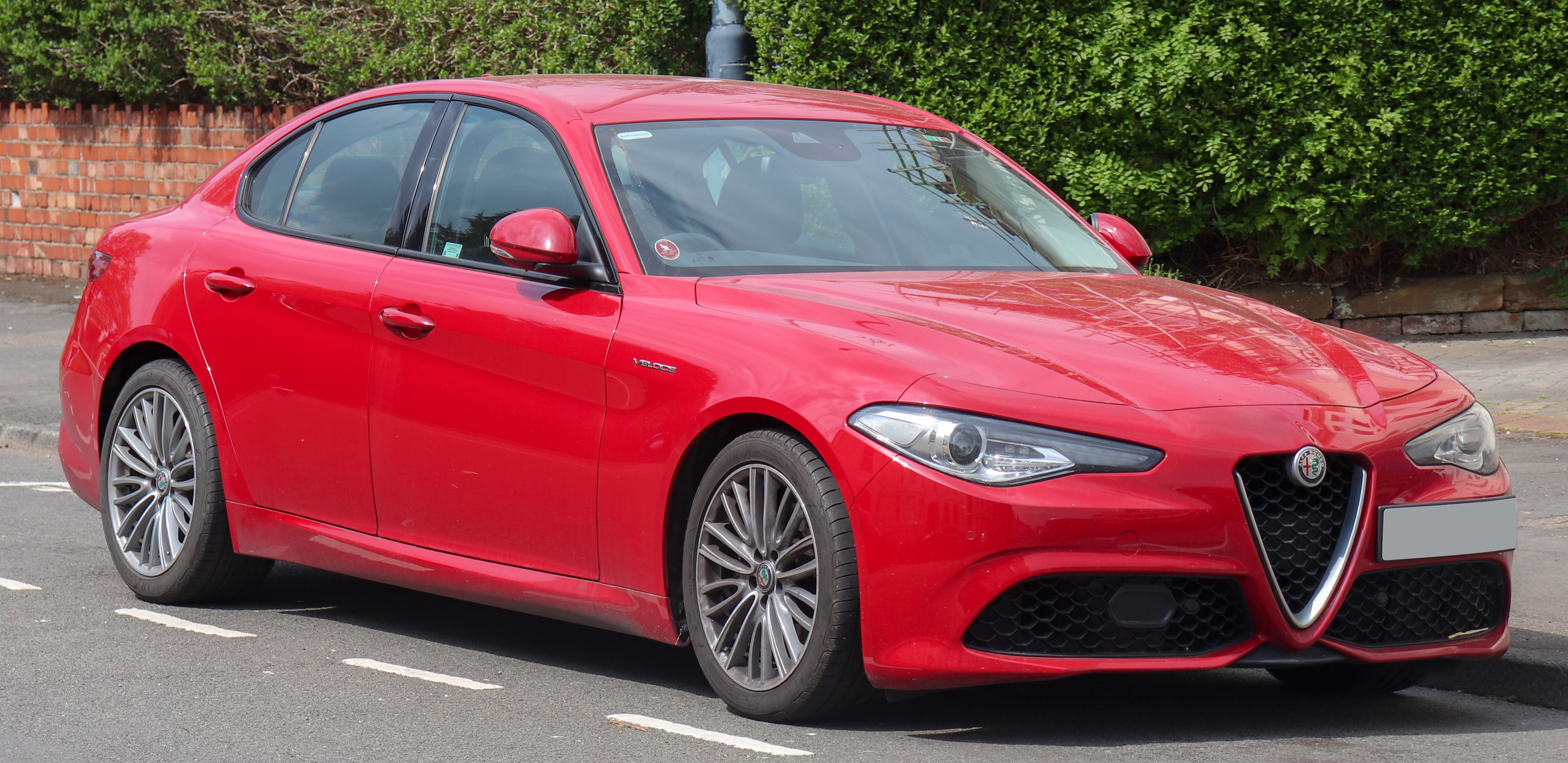
Alfa Romeo Giulia

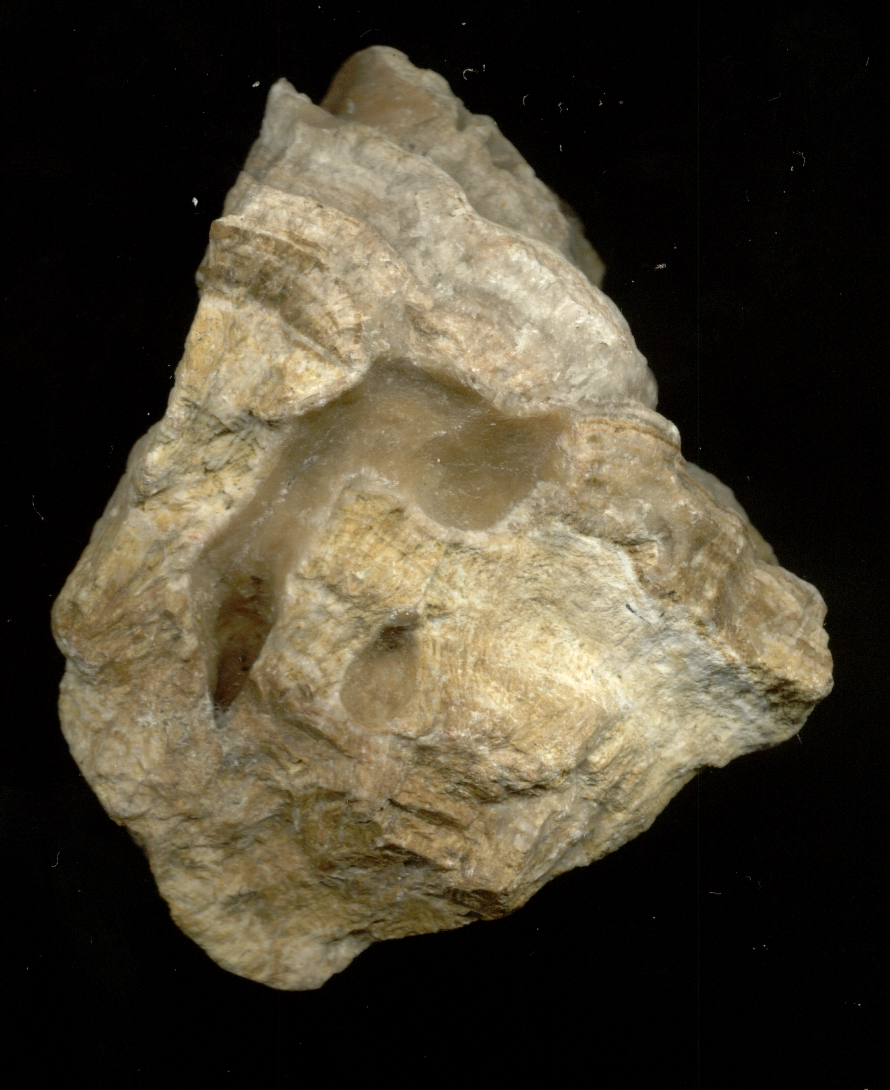
Travertine

Industry contributes a small part of GDP: its share is 8.9% compared to 25.0% in Veneto and 24.0% in Emilia-Romagna. In Rome it is even less with 7%, compared with 12% from tourism. Since a large part of Lazio's GDP is produced by the service sector, with high value added.

Firms are often small to medium in size and operate in the following industries:

- oil refining (Gaeta)
- automobile (Cassino Plant, which produced 53,422 Alfa Romeo cars in 2020 and has 3,433 employees.)
- yachts and boats (Canados Shipyard in Rome-Ostia)
- engineering (Rieti, Anagni (rotor blades and composite structures; stone extractions machines Fantoni Sud), Frosinone (helicopter transmissions))
- electronic (Viterbo, Rome, Pomezia, Latina). A large Texas Instruments plant in Rieti was closed with the loss of thousands of jobs.
- building and building materials (Rome, Civitavecchia)
  - Well-developed travertine-processing industry, especially in the Ausoni-Tiburtina area (Tivoli and Guidonia Montecelio quarries).
  - ca. 70% of the national sanitary ceramics comes from Civita Castellana industrial district and Gaeta
- textile (Valle del Liri). In the district the production relationships are mostly of the subcontractor type, 40% of the companies produce semi-finished and finished products not intended for marketing.

There is some R&D activity in high technology: IBM (IBM Rome Software Lab), Ericsson, Leonardo Electronics (Rome-Tiburtina, Rome-Laurentina, Pomezia, Latina), Rheinmetall ("Radar House") and tire industry: Bridgestone (R&D center in Rome and proving grounds in Aprilia).

=== Consumer goods ===
The most distinctive industry in Lazio is production of household chemicals, pharmaceutical, hygiene goods and medical products: Sigma-Tau, Johnson & Johnson, Procter & Gamble, Colgate Palmolive, Henkel, Pfizer, Abbott, Catalent, Angelini, Menarini, Biopharma, Wepa.

=== Space ===
- Avio in Colleferro has headquarters and make research, development and manufacturing of solid propellant motors and liquid propellant engines for launch vehicles and tactical propulsion systems; boosters for Ariane 5 rocket
- Satellite services are provided from Telespazio which headquarters in Rome
- Thales Alenia Space has 2 locations in Rome (Tiburtina and Saccomuro) and makes design and integration of terrestrial observation, navigation and telecommunications satellites

=== Agriculture ===
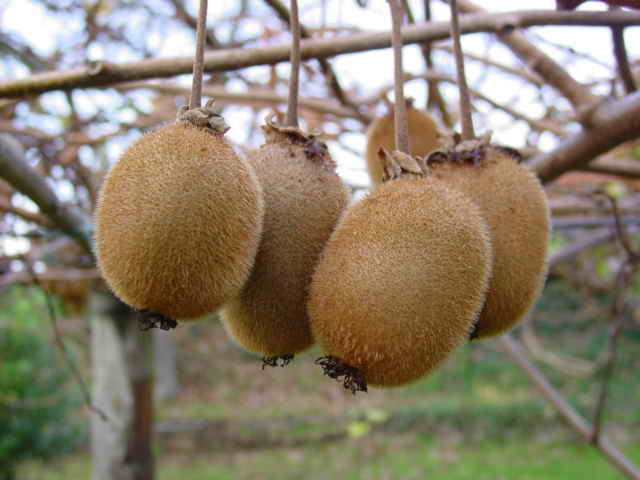
Kiwifruit

Cereals	Cultivated area, ha
Durum wheat	53,398
Barley	14,294
Wheat	12,850
Maize	11,720
Oats	5,635

From fruits the most important are kiwifruit (1st place in Italy) and hazel nuts "Nocciola romana". Italy itself is the second largest producer of kiwifruit worldwide and was surpassed only by China. Infrastructure which has been used for grape growing was easily adapted for kiwifruit cultivation.

=== Animal husbandry ===
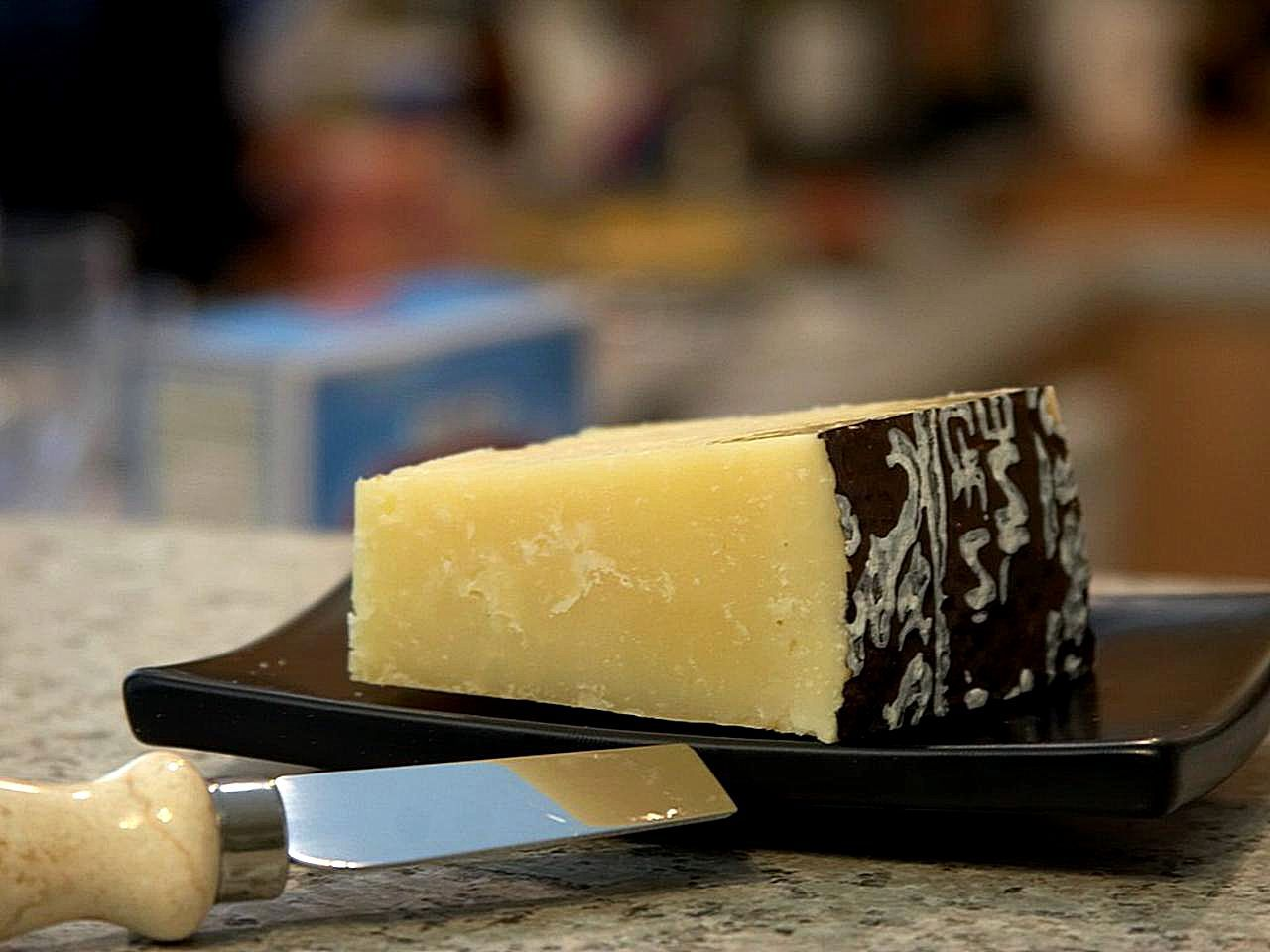
Pecorino romano cheese

2019	Italy	Share %	Lazio	Share %	% Lazio in Italian Total
Cattle	5,974,947	26.0%	202,124	18.4%	3.4%
Buffalo	402,286	1.8%	60,821	5.5%	15.1%
Sheep	7,000,880	30.5%	750,529	68.2%	10.7%
Goats	1,058,720	4.6%	35,194	3.2%	3.3%
Pigs	8,510,268	37.1%	51,740	4.7%	0.6%
Total	22,947,101	100.0%	1,100,408	100.0%	4.8%

Only sheep and buffalo herds are significant nationwide. Both are kept predominantly for milk, which is used in the production of pecorino romano and mozzarella di bufala cheese. Sheep herds are the 3rd nationwide after Sardinia and Sicily. 40% of sheep are bred in province of Viterbo.

=== Viticulture ===
Vineyards cover 47,884 hectares (118,320 acres) in Lazio. 90% of wines are white. In production of quality wine Lazio has rank 14 of 20 with 190.557 hl. There are 3 DOCG wines:

- Frascati Superiore
- Cannellino di Frascati
- Cesanese del Piglio

=== Tourism ===
The Colosseum, symbol of Rome in the world, World Heritage Site and one of the seven wonders of the modern world

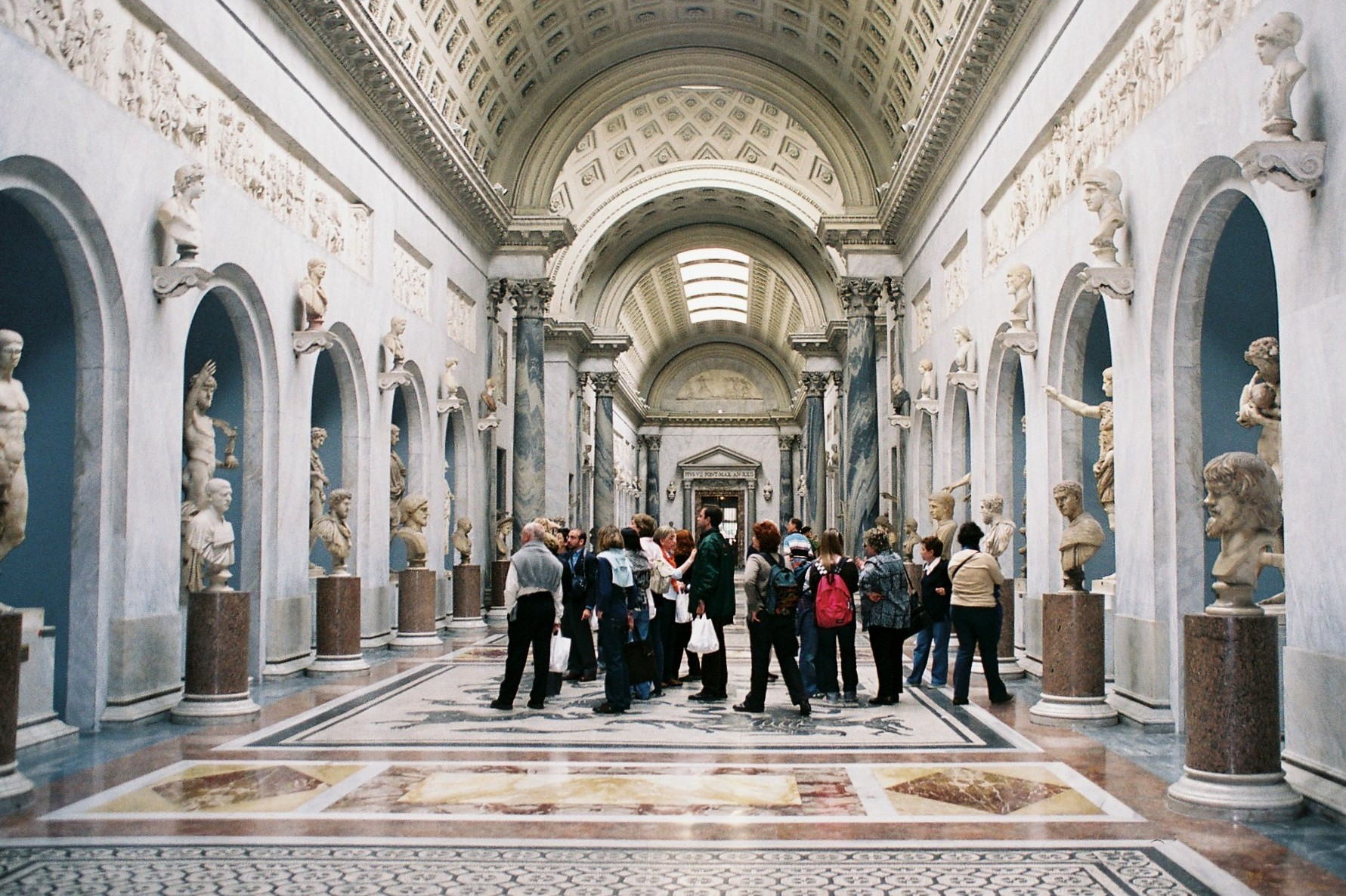
The Vatican Museums, one of the most visited art museums in the world

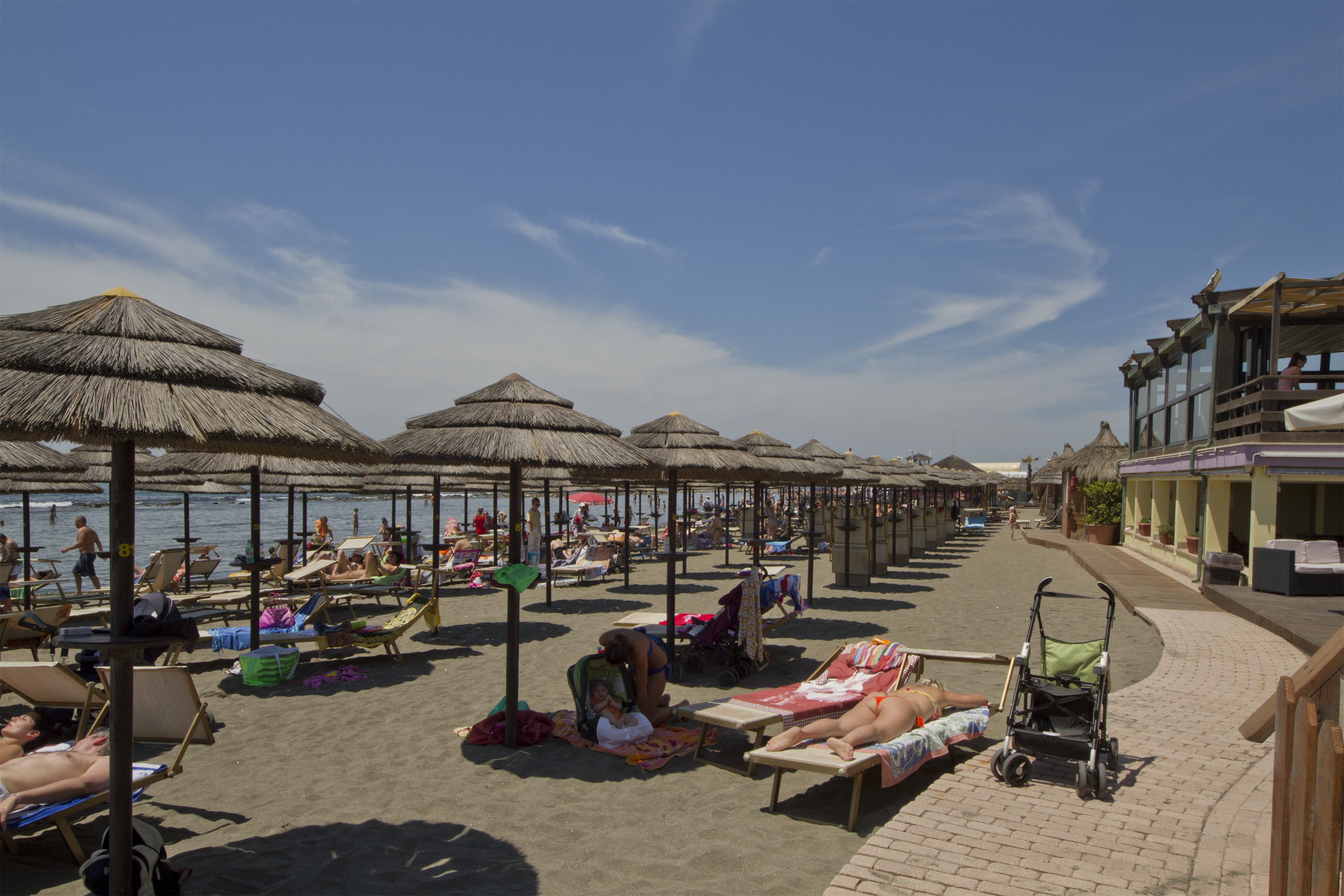
Ostia Lido beach

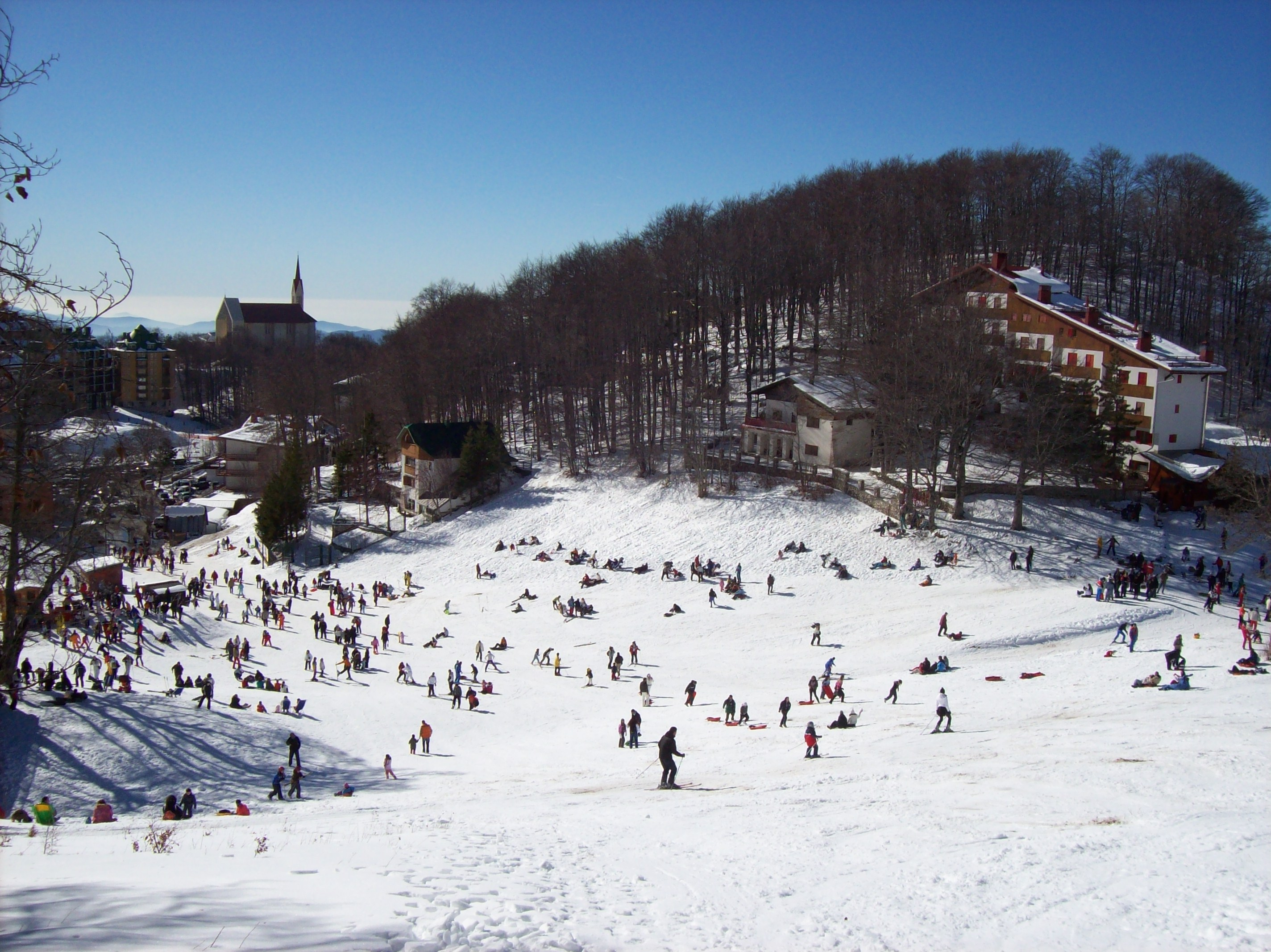
Skiers on the slope at Pian de' Valli (Monte Terminillo)

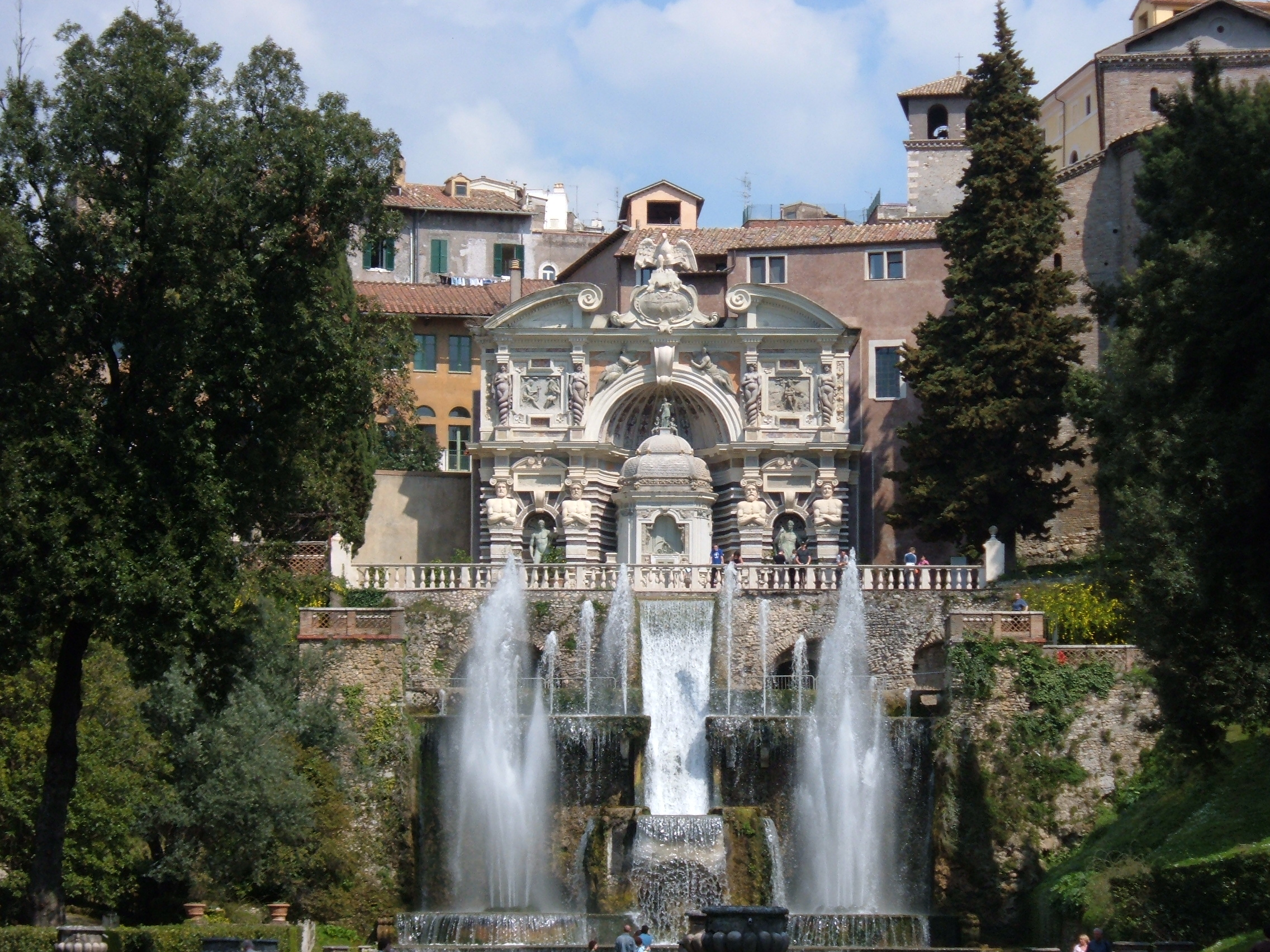
Villa d'Este in Tivoli, UNESCO World Heritage Site

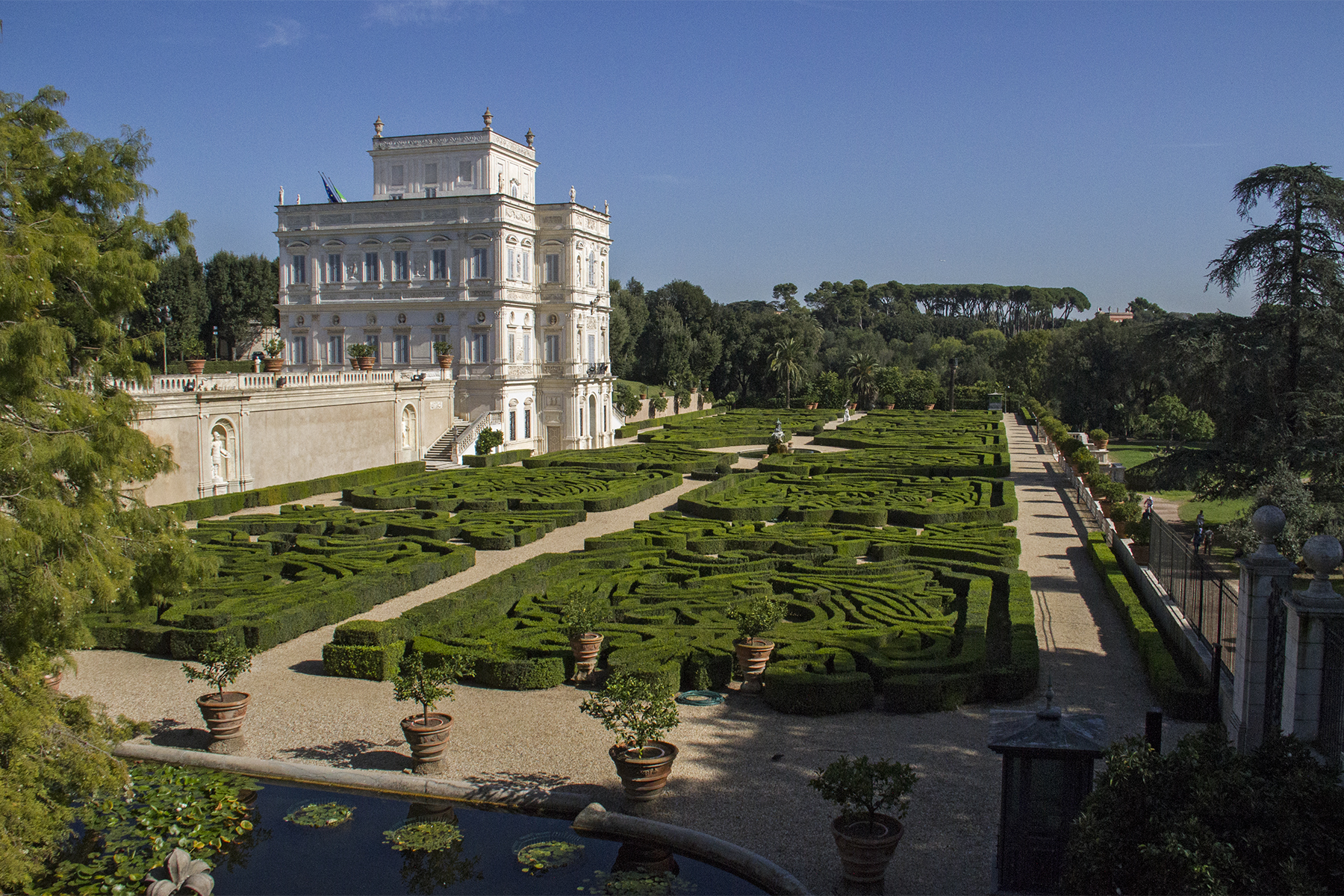
Casino del Bel Respiro, Villa Doria Pamphili

Tourism in Lazio is a thriving sector especially as regards tourism linked to art and monuments and places of interest in the region (Rome in particular), religious tourism (Vatican City, Rome and the sanctuaries of Lazio), summer seaside tourism especially in upper and lower Lazio (Santa Marinella, Ladispoli, Anzio, Nettuno, Sabaudia, San Felice Circeo, Terracina, Sperlonga, Gaeta) and summer/winter tourism in the ski resorts of the Lazio Apennines (Monte Terminillo, Leonessa, Cittareale, Monte Livata, Campo Staffi and Campocatino, Altipiani di Arcinazzo). Other points of interest in the region are the area of the Roman Castles, located south-east of the city of Rome, around the Alban Hills, made up of a group of towns and cities, partly in the territory of Latium Vetus, surrounded by the Roman Campagna. Also the areas around Lake Bracciano and Lake Bolsena, Lazio is home to 14 lakes of volcanic origin. One of the most important archaeological park in Italy is Ostia Antica, known as the port of ancient Rome, Ostia was a city of the Latium Vetus, located near the mouth of the Tiber river. Civita di Bagnoregio, also known as "the dying city", has become a popular tourist destination in the country.

According to Istat data relating to 2018, Lazio is one of the most visited regions in Italy and Europe and one of the first in terms of number of international presences. Rome is the most visited city in Italy with around 30 million visitors per year. Among the most visited sites of interest include the Colosseum and Imperial fora, Castel Sant'Angelo and the complex of Hadrian's Villa and Villa d'Este, among the museum itineraries the Pantheon, the Gardens of Bomarzo, the Abbey of Fossanova, Monte Cassino Abbey and Farfa Abbey.

Lazio has many small and picturesque villages, 25 of them have been selected by I Borghi più belli d'Italia (English: The most beautiful Villages of Italy), a non-profit private association of small Italian towns of strong historical and artistic interest, that was founded on the initiative of the Tourism Council of the National Association of Italian Municipalities.

=== Statistics ===
Lazio GDP growth from 2013 to 2017 in euro:

	2013	2014	2015	2016	2017
Lazio	181.204,9	181,750.8	183.417,6	190,600.4	193,796.8

In 2019 there were 657,855 companies, 10.8% of the national total.

The table below shows the GDP, produced in Lazio at current market prices in 2006, expressed in millions of euros, broken down into the main economic macro-activities:

Macro-economic activity	Product GDP	% sector on regional GDP	% sector on Italian GDP
Agriculture, forestry, fishing	€1,709.3	1.06%	1.84%
Industry in the strict sense	€14,208.2	8.85%	18.30%
Buildings	€6,872.1	4.28%	5.41%
Commerce, repairs, hotels and restaurants, transport and communications	€37,305.5	23.24%	20.54%
Monetary and financial intermediation; real estate and entrepreneurial activities	€45,100.7	28.10%	24.17%
Other service activities	€39,411.8	24.55%	18.97%
VAT, net indirect taxes on products and taxes on imports	€15,909.9	9.91%	10.76%
Lazio GDP at market prices	€160,517.5		

=== Unemployment ===
The unemployment rate stood at 7.7% in 2022.

Year	2006	2007	2008	2009	2010	2011	2012	2013	2014	2015	2016	2017	2018	2019	2020	2021	2022
unemployment rate (in %)	7.5%	6.4%	7.5%	8.4%	9.2%	8.7%	10.6%	12.0%	12.5%	11.8%	11.1%	10.7%	11.2%	9.9%	9.1%	10.0%	7.7%

== Cuisine ==
One of the most famous forms of food in Lazio is pasta. Dishes first attested inside the region's borders include:

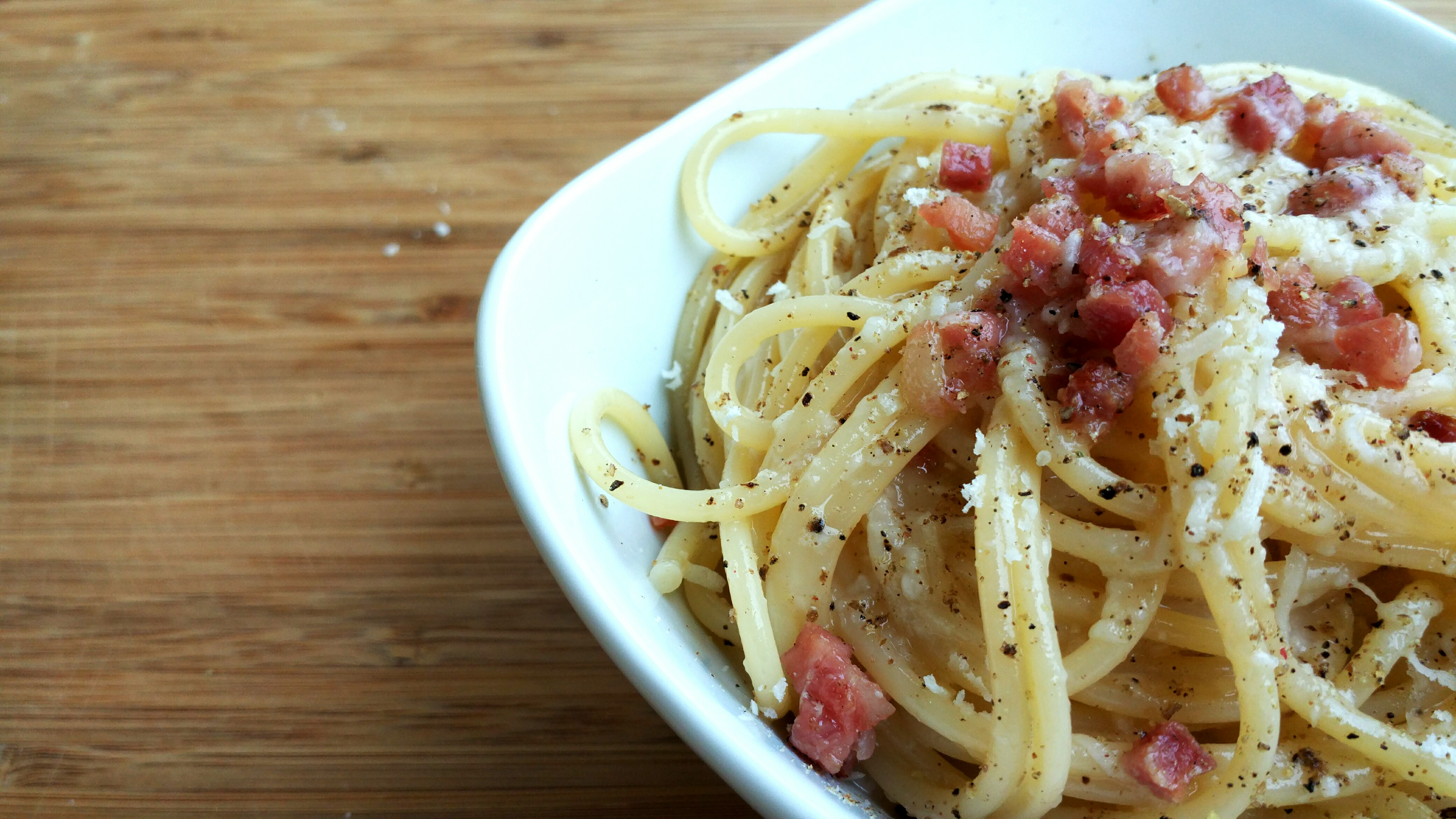
Spaghetti alla Carbonara

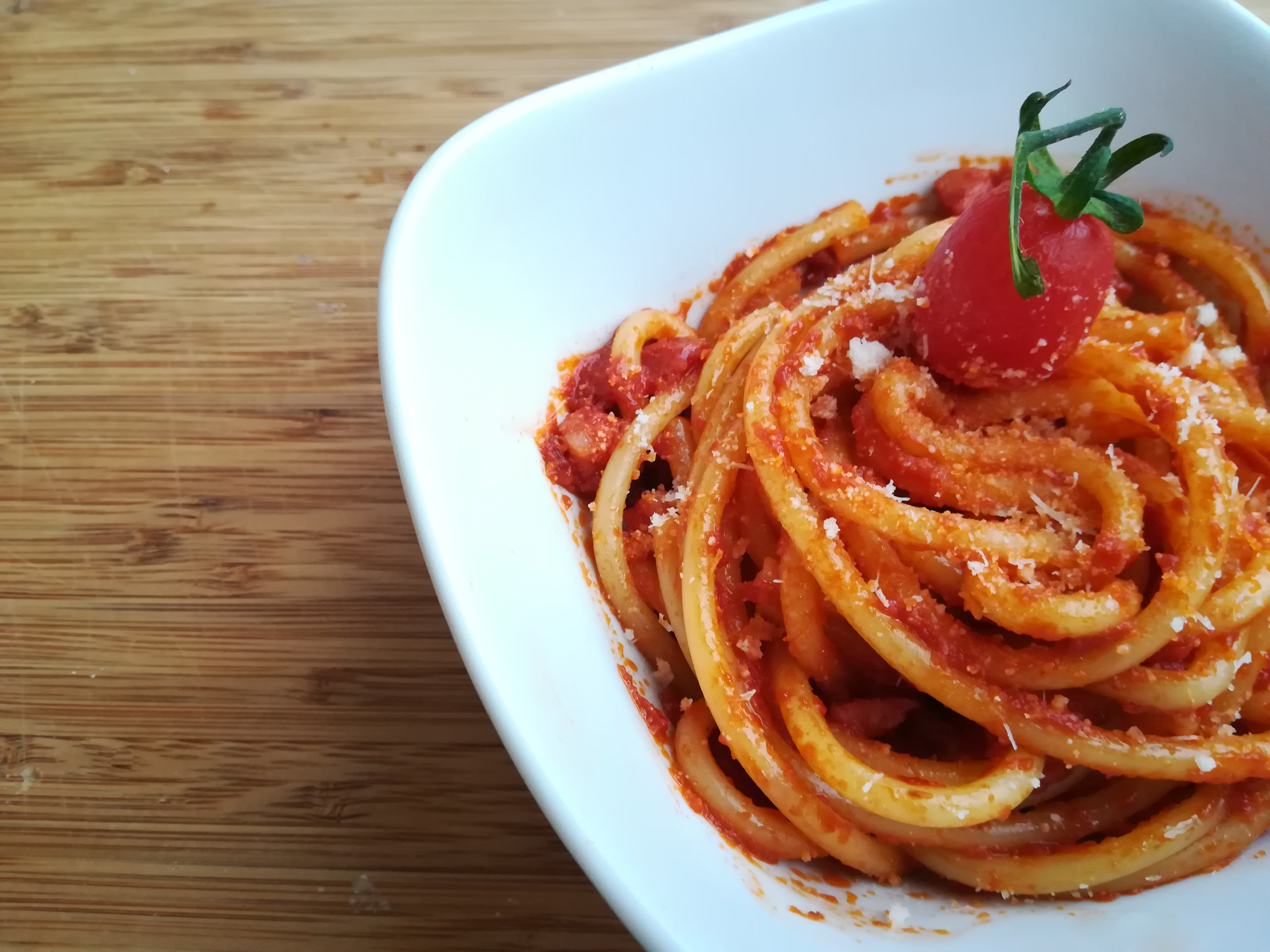
Bucatini all'amatriciana

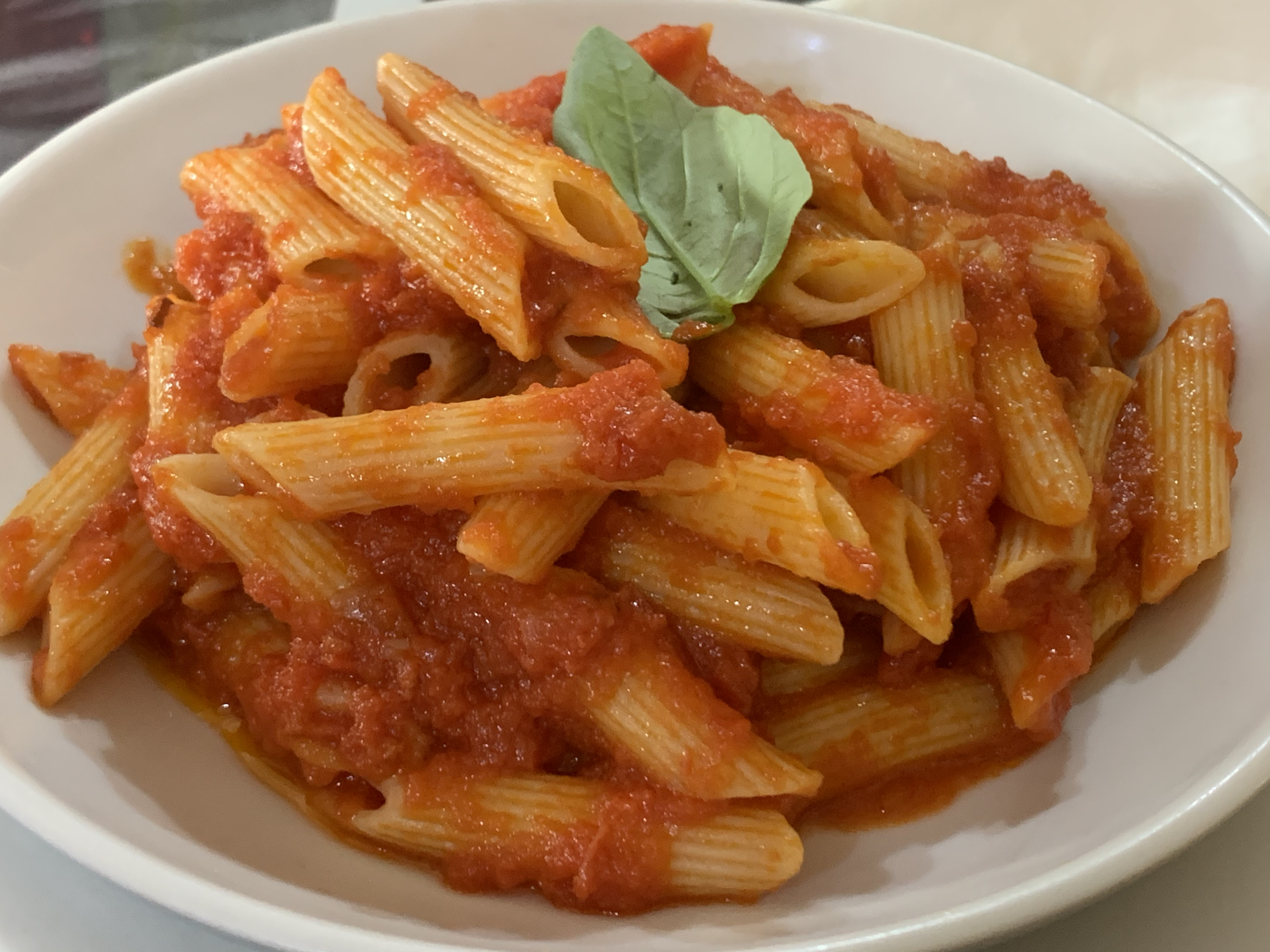
Penne all'arrabbiata

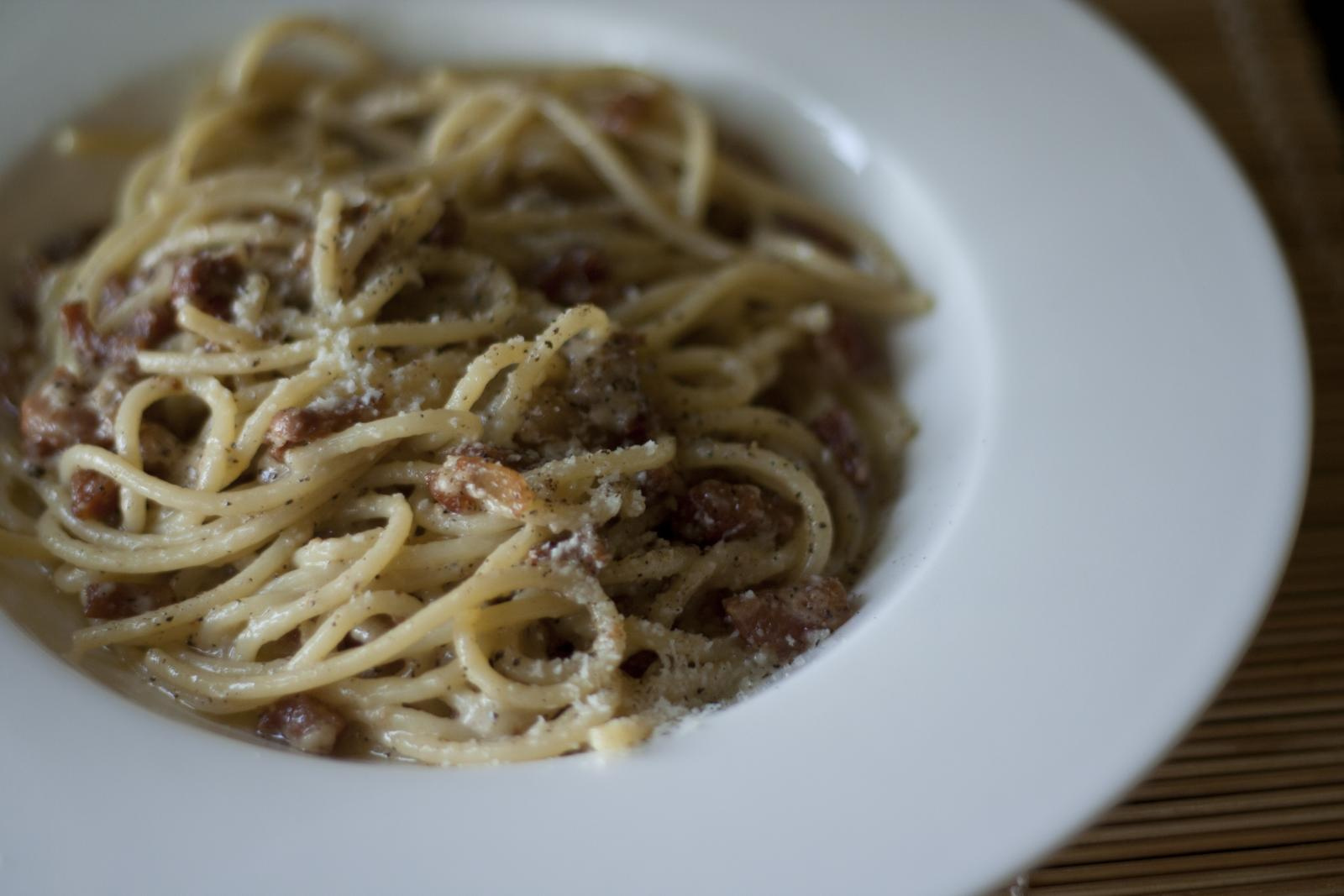
Spaghetti alla gricia

Guanciale is used in several sauces. Guanciale is the cut of pork obtained from the cheek of the pig, crossed by lean veins of muscle with a component of valuable fat, of a composition different from lardo ("back fat") and pancetta ("belly fat"): the consistency is harder than pancetta and it possesses a more distinctive flavor. Guanciale is salted pork fat, different from bacon, which is smoked. It is a typical product of Lazio, Umbria and Abruzzo. Another important ingredient is pecorino romano cheese.

Vegetables are common, artichokes ("carciofi") being among the most popular:

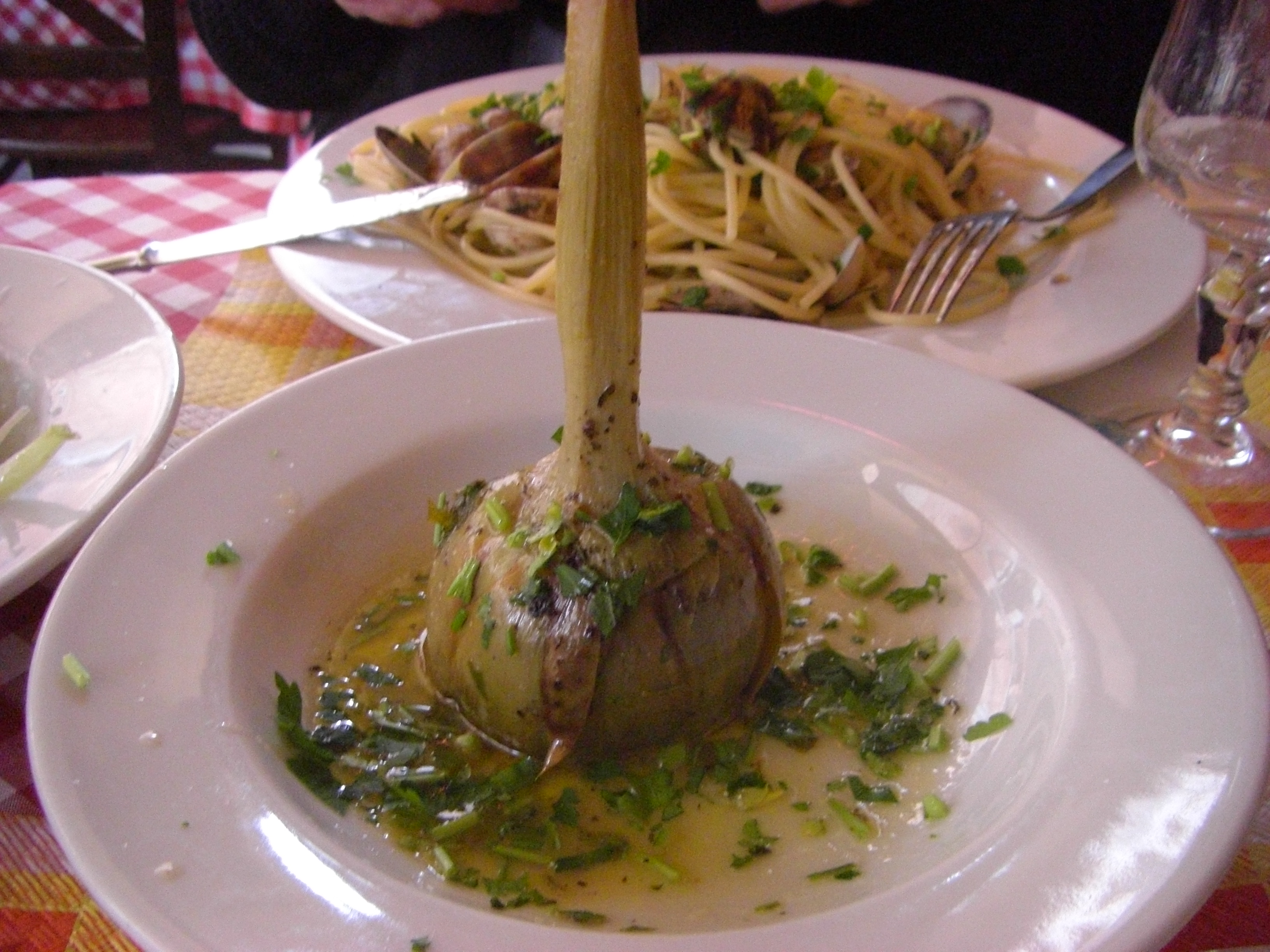
Carciofi alla romana

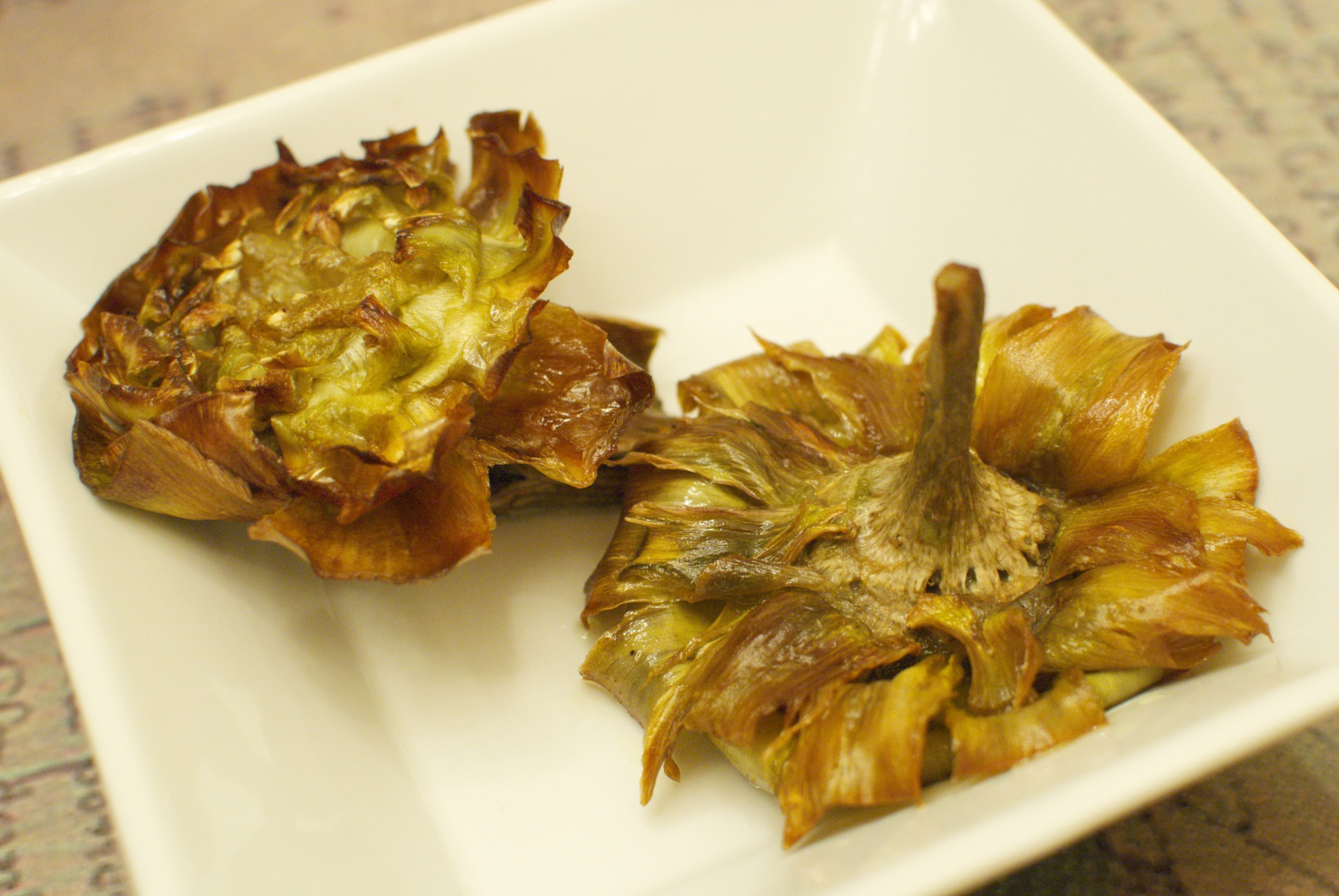
Carciofi alla giudia

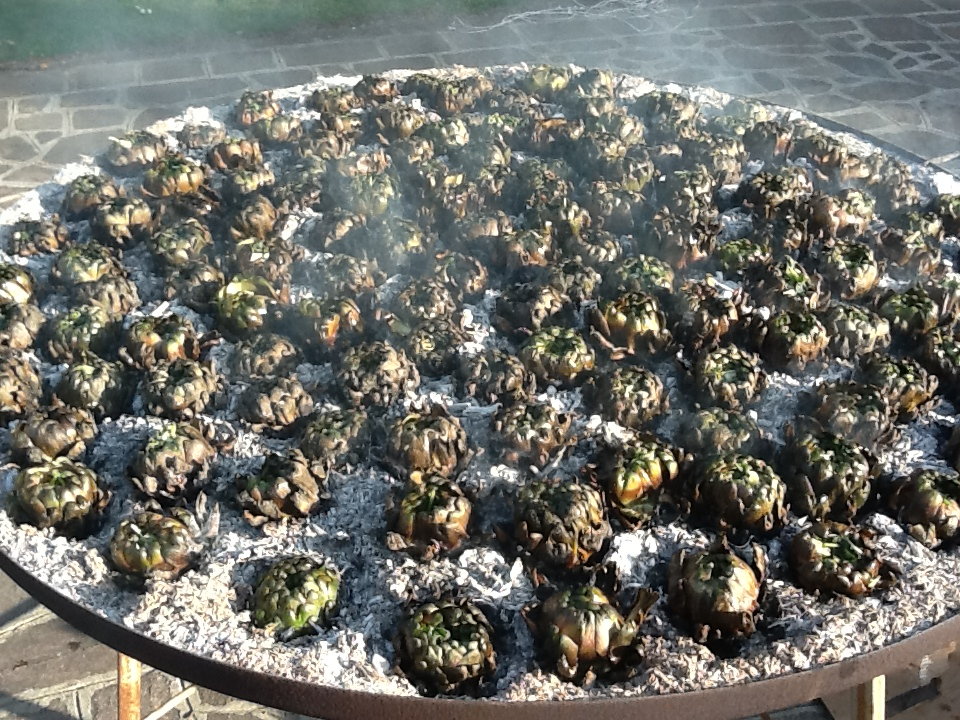
Carciofolata

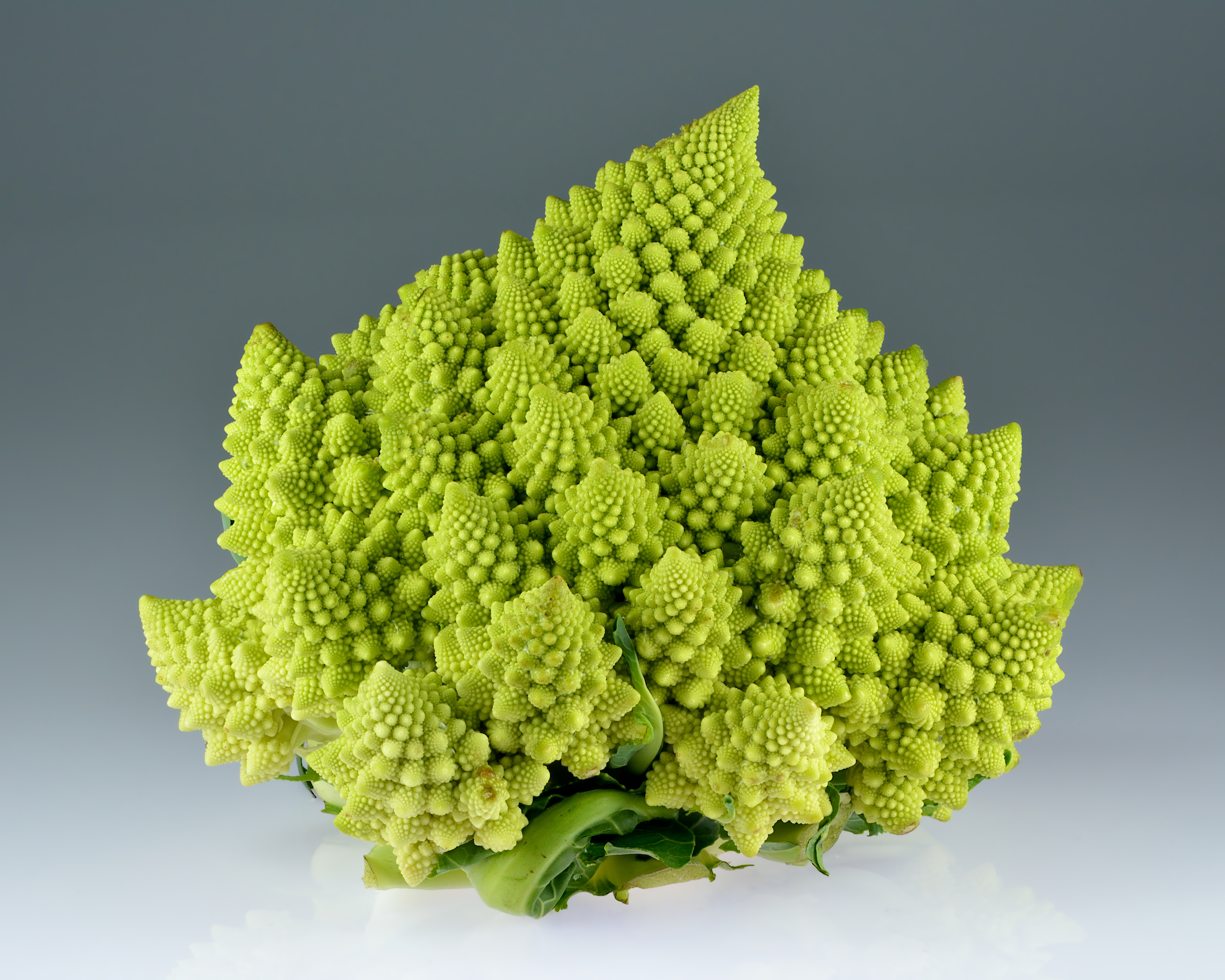
Romanesco broccoli

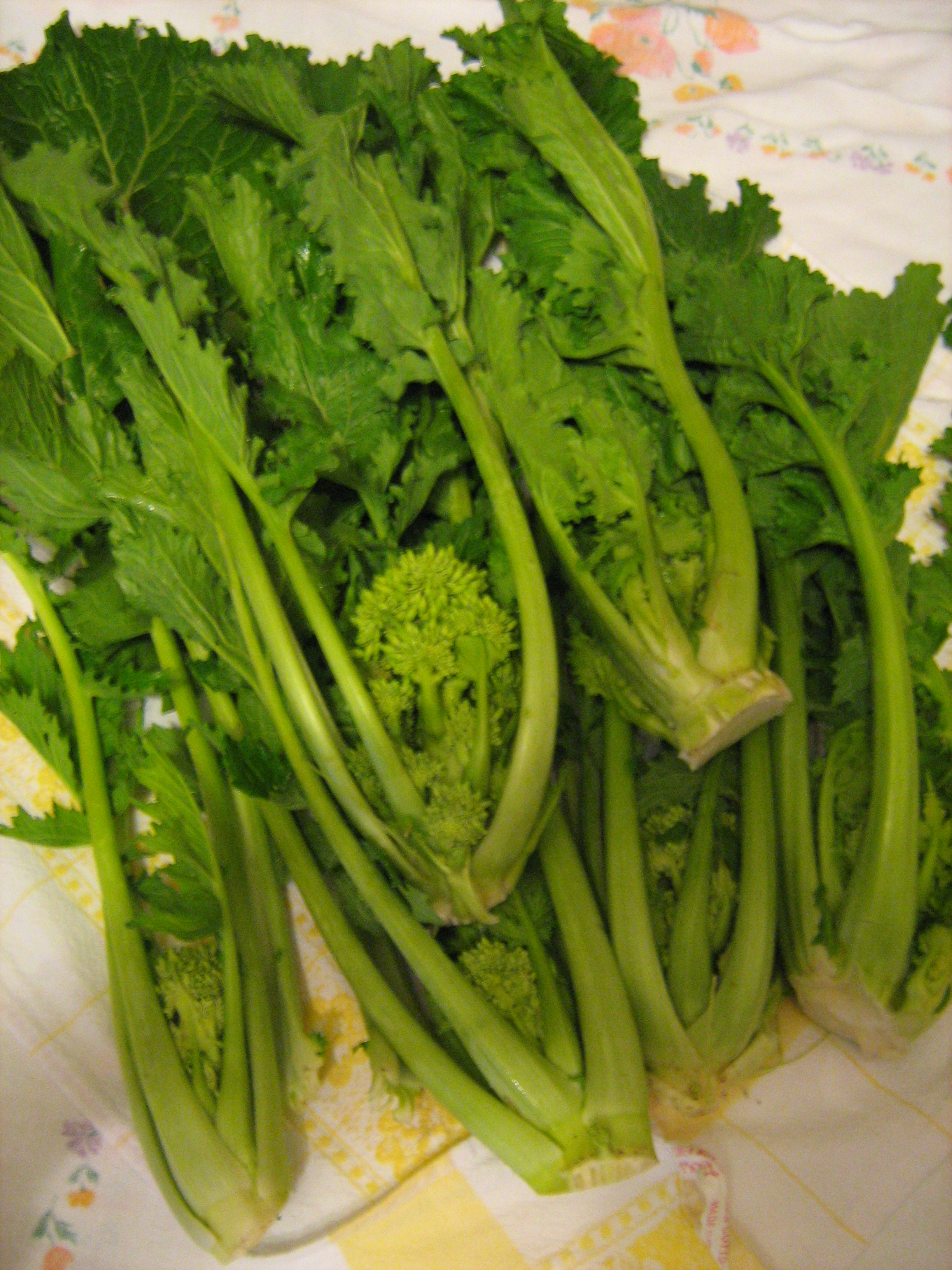
Cima di rapa

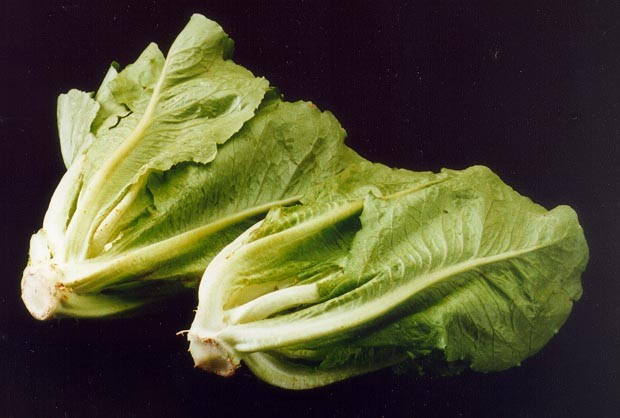
Romaine lettuce

Other popular vegetables are romanesco broccoli, asparagus, fava bean, cima di rapa, romaine lettuce, pumpkin, zucchini and chicory.

=== Spices ===
In the cuisine of Lazio, spices are widely used. Among the most used are lesser cat-mint, called in Rome "mentuccia" (for artichokes and mushrooms), squaw mint, called in Rome "menta romana" (for lamb and tripe), laurel, rosemary, sage, juniper, chili and grated truffle.

=== Quinto quarto ===
Although Roman and Lazio cuisine use cheap ingredients like vegetable and pasta, poor people needed a source of protein. Therefore, they used the so-called "quinto quarto" ("fifth quarter"), leftovers from animal carcasses that remained after the sale of prized parts to the wealthy.

Quinto quarto includes tripe (the most valuable part of reticulum, also called "cuffia", "l'omaso" or "lampredotto"), kidneys (which need to be soaked for a long time in water with lemon to remove urine smell), heart, liver, spleen, sweetbreads (pancreas, thymus and salivary glands), brain, tongue, ox tail, trotters and pajata (intestines of calf, fed only with its mother's milk). The intestines are cleaned and skinned but the chyme (mass of partly digested food) is left inside. Typical dishes of this style are:

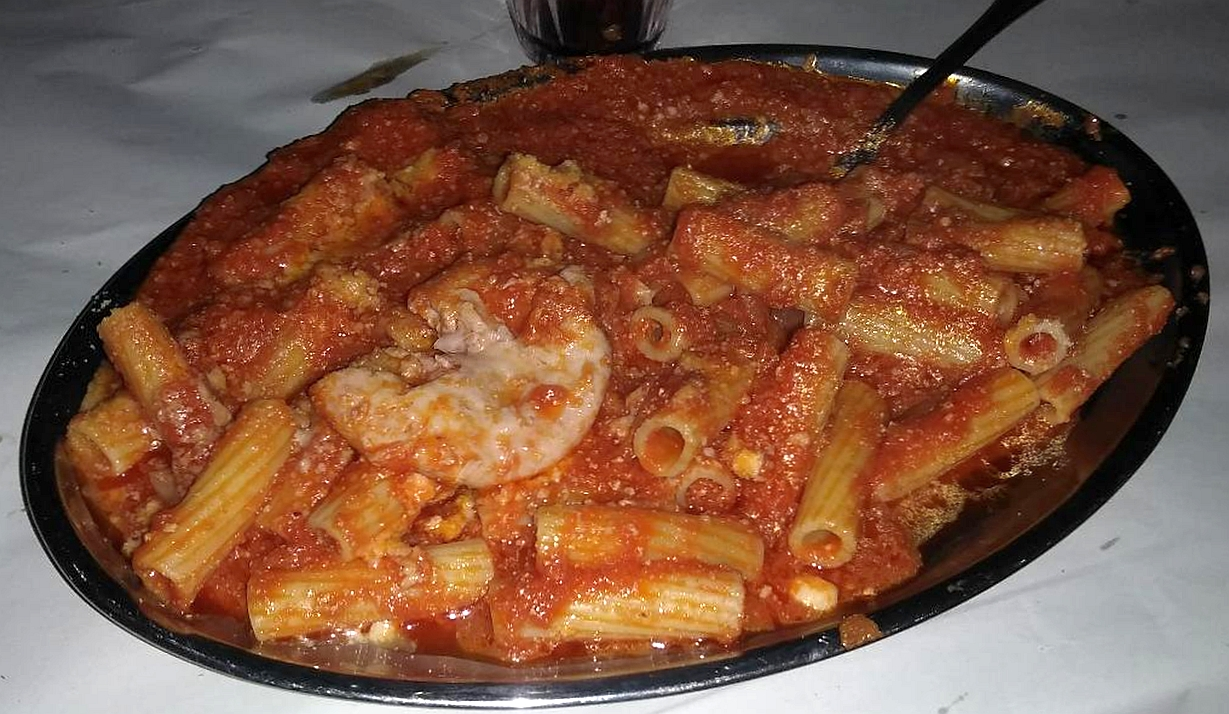
Rigatoni con la pajata

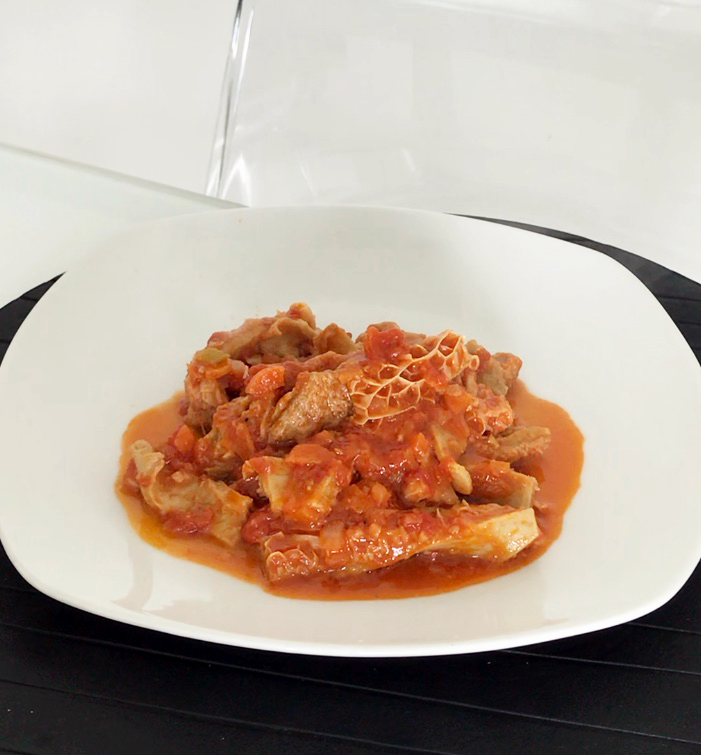
Trippa alla romana

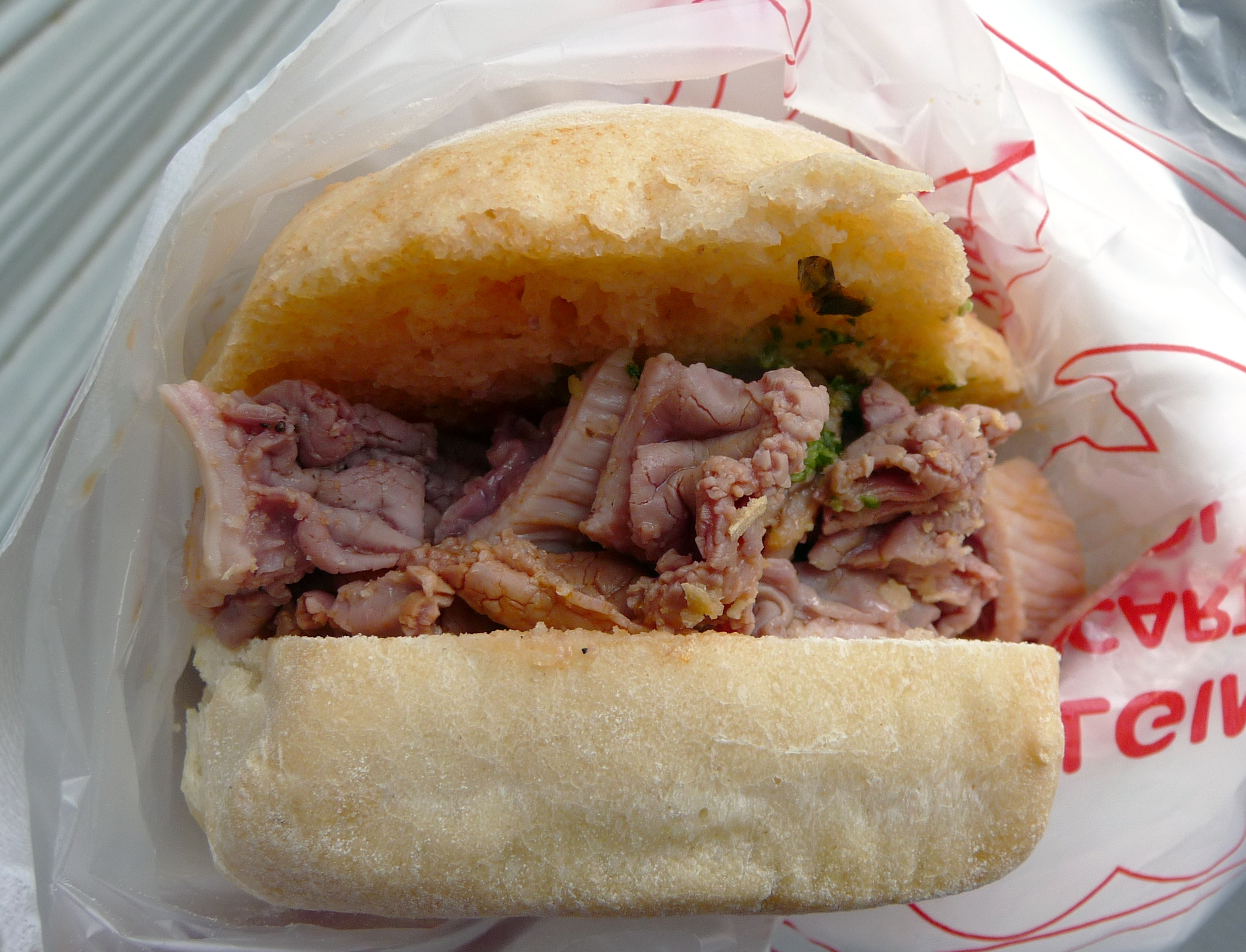
Lampredotto sandwich

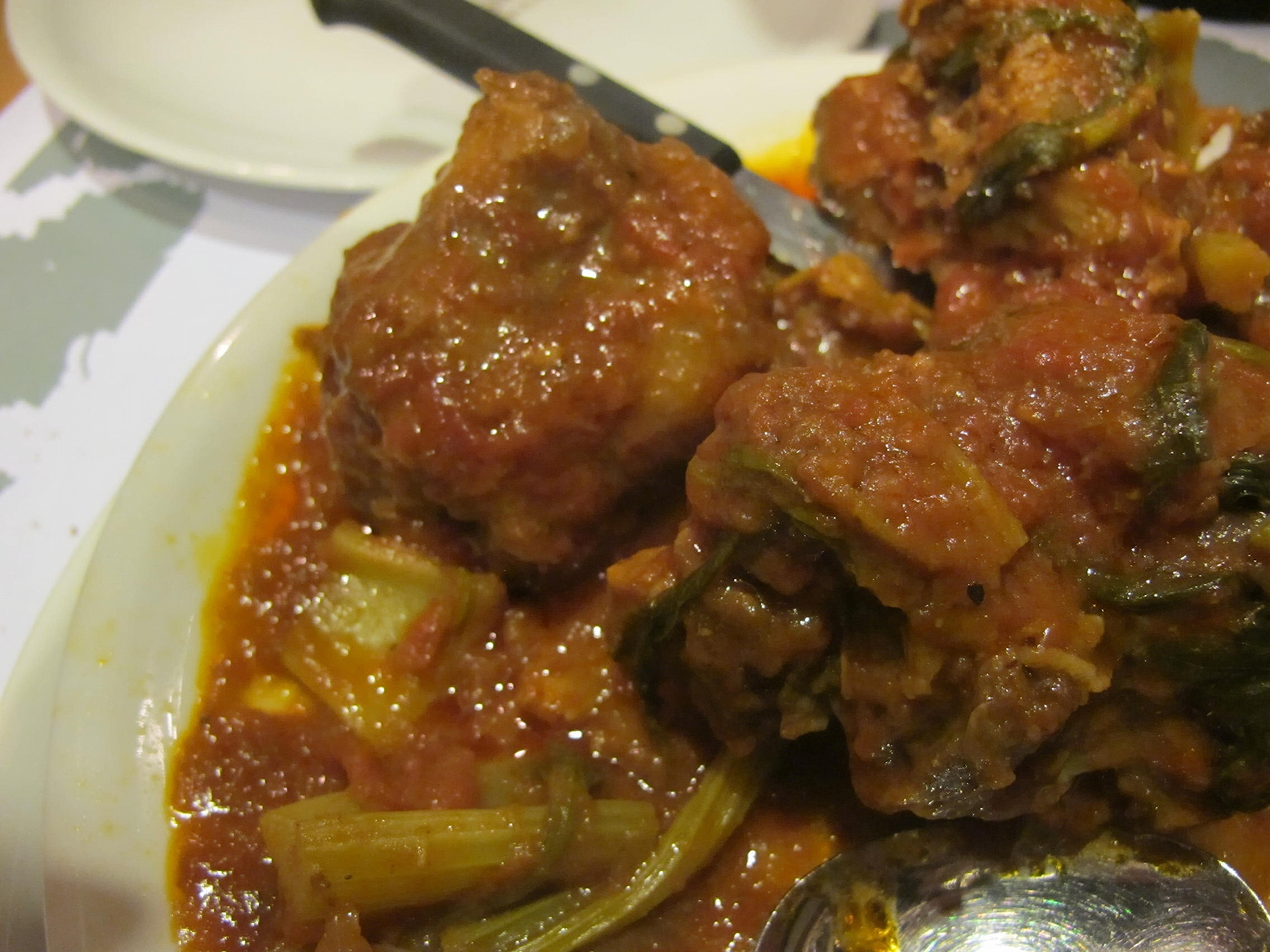
Coda alla vaccinara

=== Meat dishes ===
Traditional meat dishes include Saltimbocca alla romana (veal wrapped with Prosciutto di Parma DOP and sage and cooked in white wine, butter and flour) and Abbacchio alla romana (roasted lamb with garlic, rosemary, pepper and chopped prosciutto).

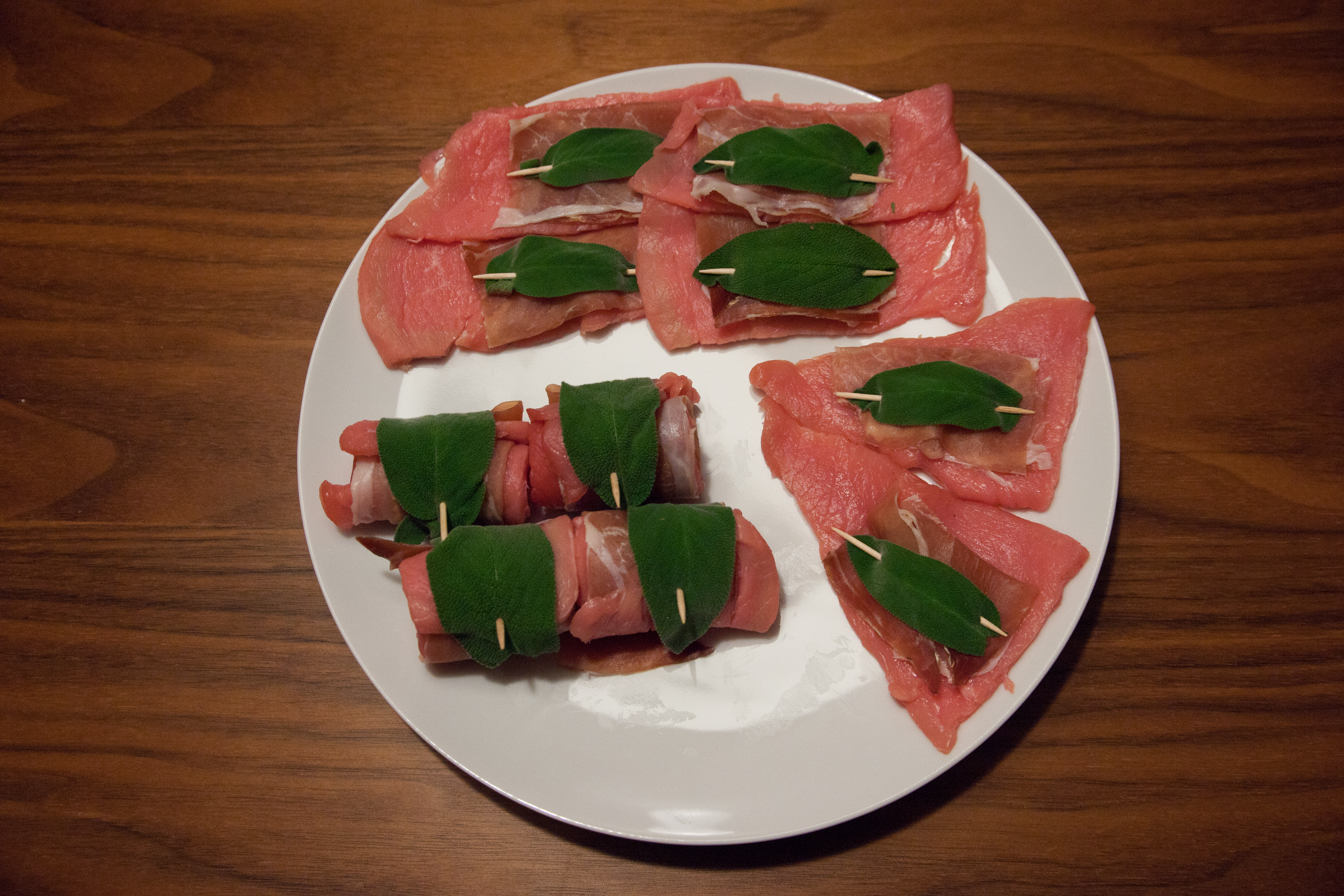
Saltimbocca alla romana (uncooked)

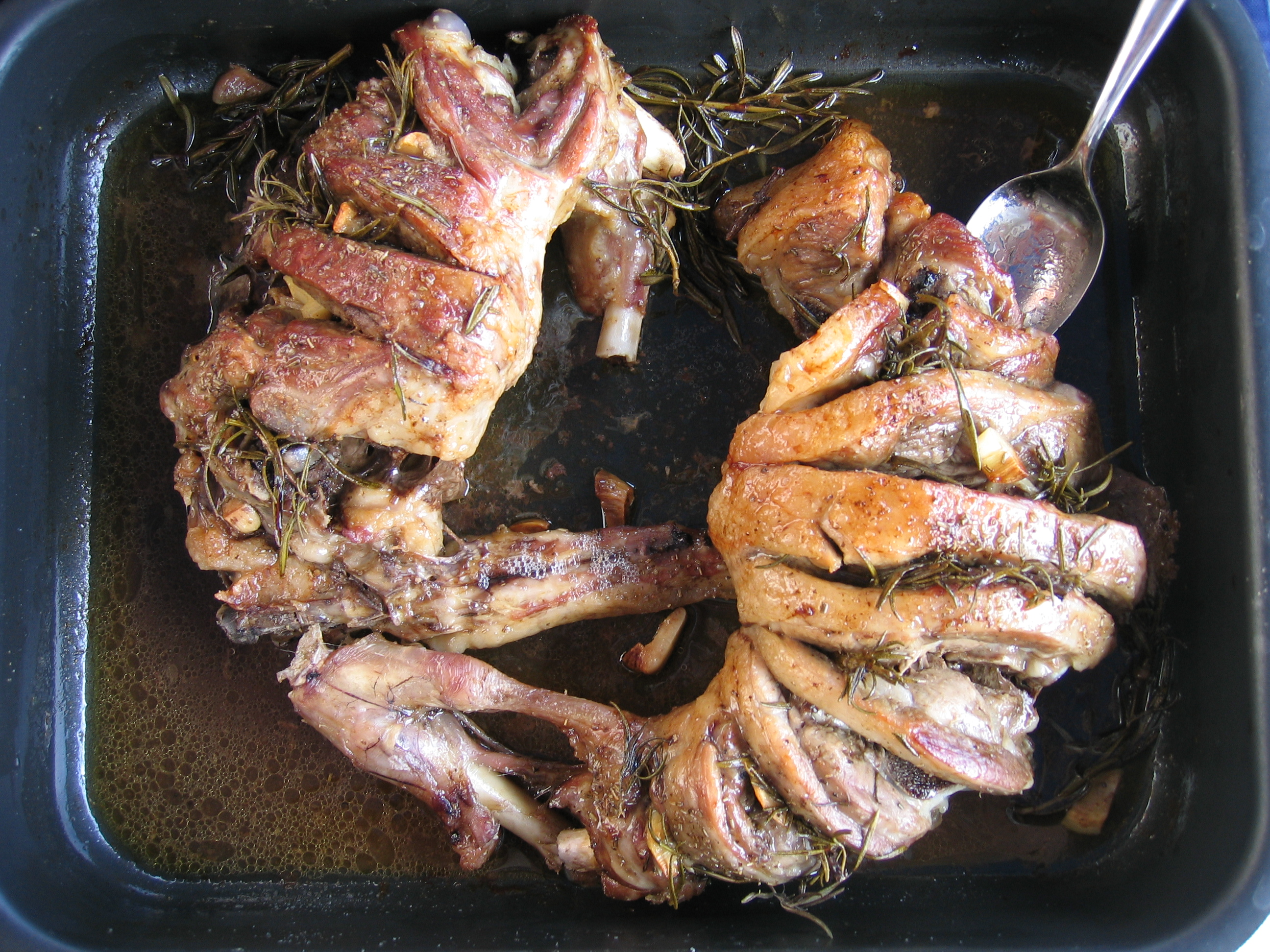
Abbacchio

== Sports ==
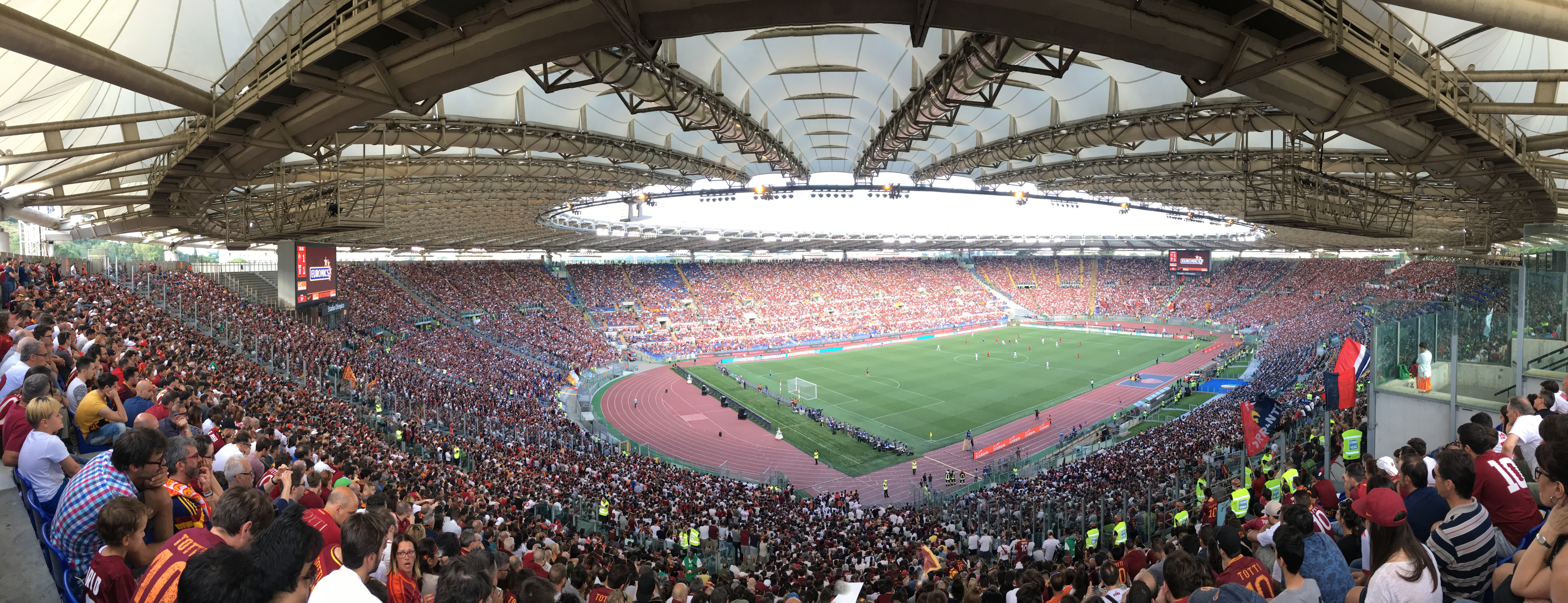
Panoramic view of the Stadio Olimpico

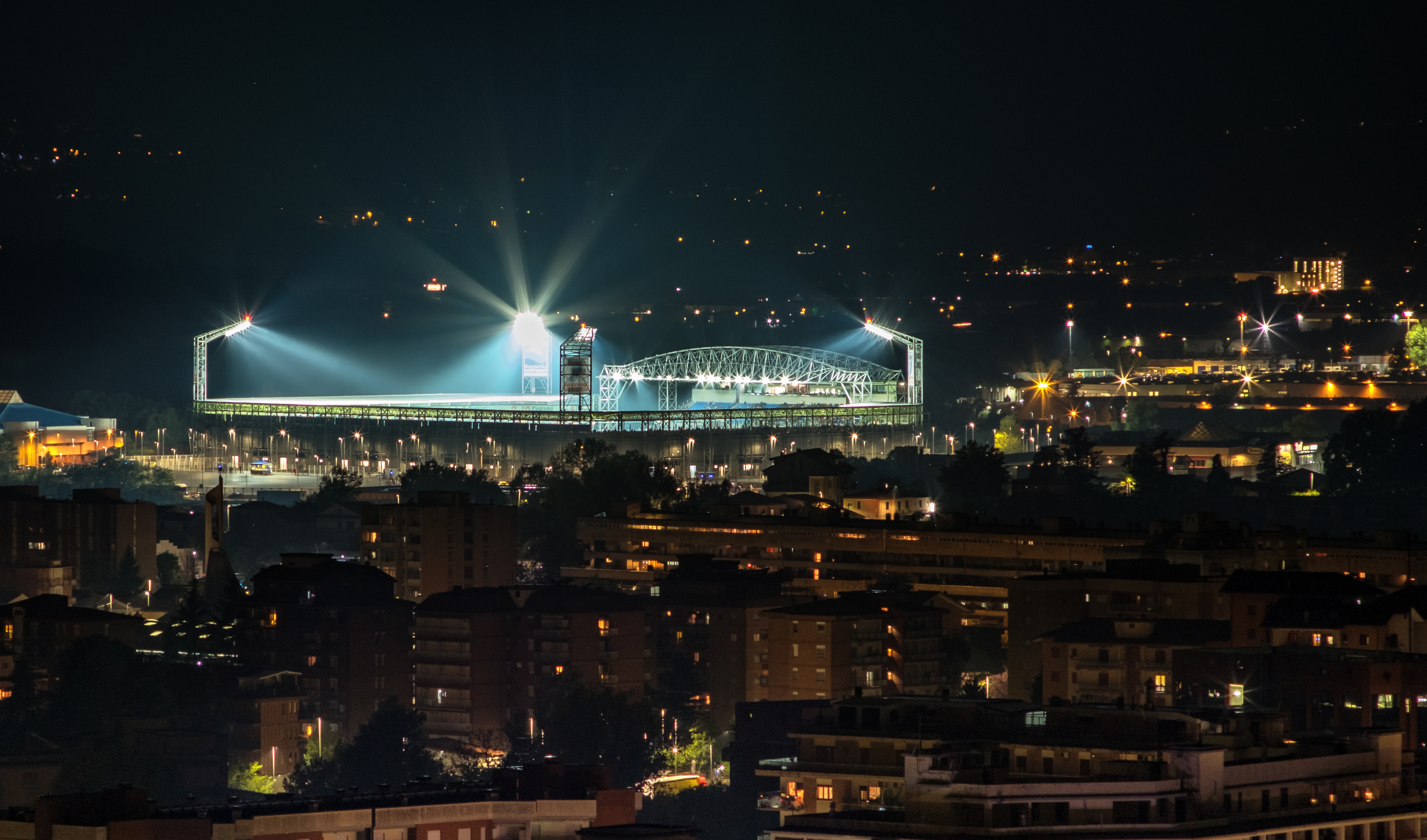
Stadio Benito Stirpe at night in Frosinone

The region gives its name to the professional football club SS Lazio that plays in the Italian Serie A. The region has two professional clubs in the top flight, the other being AS Roma, who also play in the highest division of Italian football. Combined, the two have won five Italian championships with Roma winning three and Lazio two. The main sports stadium in Lazio is Stadio Olimpico in Rome which has housed both teams for a prolonged time and hosts Derby della Capitale between the two clubs. The stadium also hosted the 1960 Summer Olympics and the 1990 FIFA World Cup final. Outside of Rome the football scene has another club playing in the Serie A, that being Frosinone.

Lazio hosts no top-line motorsports events, but the Vallelunga circuit previously hosted the Superbike World Championship in motorcycle racing.

Rome is home to many international sporting events and competitions, including:

- Italian Open Internazionali d'Italia, which take place between April and May of each year at the Foro Italico;
- Rome ePrix, the Formula E championship, has been held on the Circuito Cittadino dell'EUR since 2018;
- Six Nations Championship: the home matches of the Italian national rugby team;
- International horse show "Piazza di Siena", equestrian competition held since 1922 in piazza di Siena, inside Villa Borghese;
- Golden Gala Pietro Mennea international event of athletics which takes place annually at the Stadio Olimpico;
- Rome Marathon, organized in spring with start and finish in Via dei Fori Imperiali.

== See also ==
- Geography of Italy
- Regions of Italy
- Administrative divisions of Italy
- Roman cuisine
- Lake della Duchessa
