= Carciofi alla romana =

Roman cuisine of pan braised artichokes

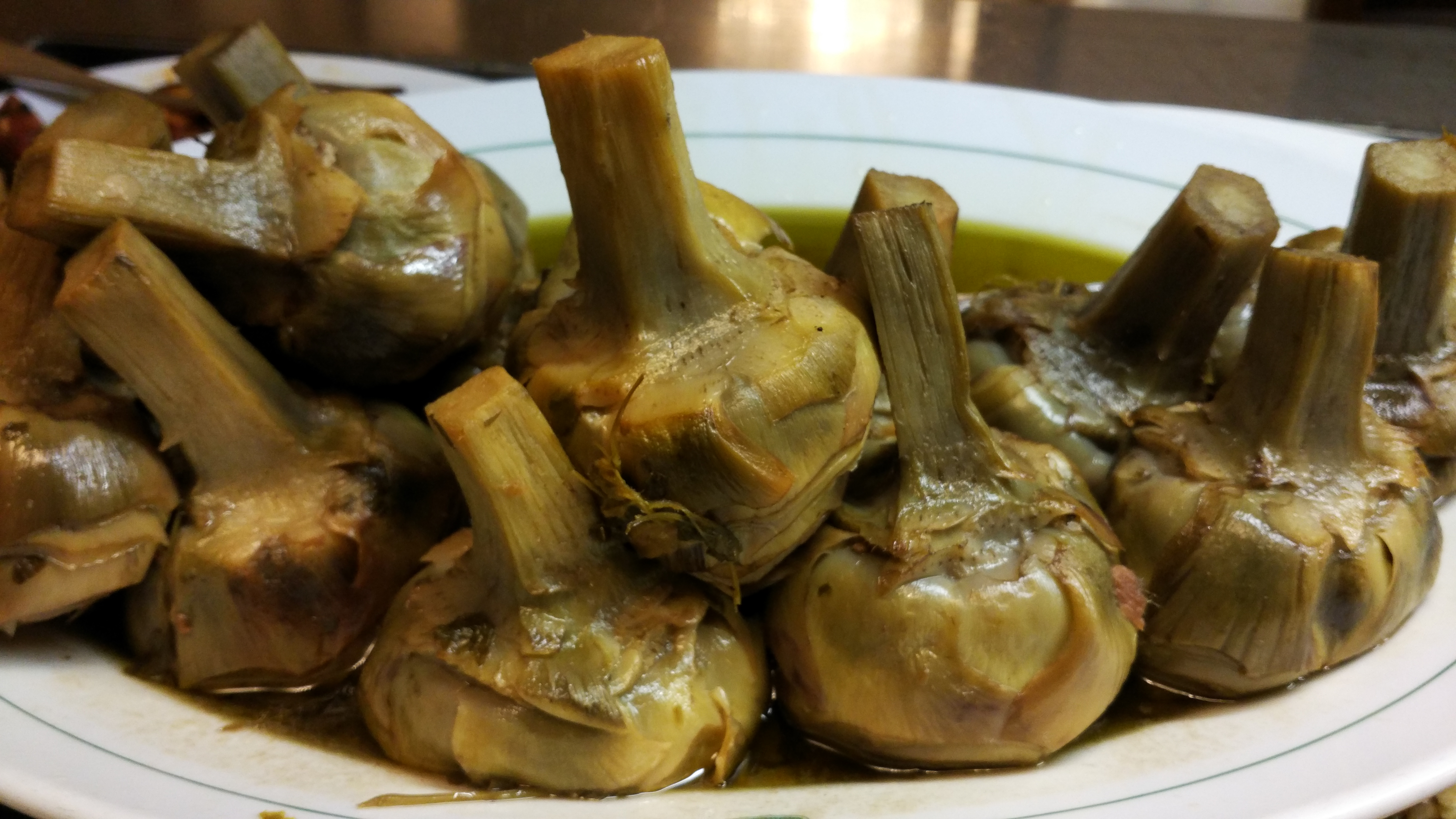
- Course: Antipasto, contorno
- Place of origin: Italy
- Region or state: Lazio
- Serving temperature: Warm or room temperature
- Main ingredients: Artichokes, lesser calamint, parsley, garlic

Carciofi alla romana (Italian: [karˈtʃɔːfi alla roˈmaːna]; lit. 'Roman-style artichokes') is a typical dish of Roman cuisine of pan braised artichokes. During spring-time in Rome, the dish is prepared in each household and is served in all restaurants. It represents one of the most famous artichoke dishes of the Roman cuisine, another being carciofi alla giudia, a deep-fried artichoke dish that originated in the Jewish community of Rome.

== Preparation ==
In Rome and surroundings this dish is prepared with artichokes of the Romanesco variety, harvested between February and April in the coastal region northwest of Rome, between Ladispoli and Civitavecchia.

The artichokes are cleaned with a sharp knife, eliminating all of the hard leaves and the thorns using an upward spiral movement. Leaving only a few centimetres of the stem with the artichoke, the cut-off stem is cleaned, cut into pieces and cooked with the artichokes. The artichokes are plunged for a few minutes into water with lemon juice, so that they do not turn brown due to oxidation. Then they are opened in the center and the choke (present only toward the end of the growing season) is removed. Into the resulting cavity of each artichoke is stuffed a mixture of parsley, lesser calamint (in Rome called mentuccia), and garlic, with salt and pepper to taste. After this preparation, all of the artichokes are put into a deep pan, standing on their stems, enough in number so that they support each other and do not fall over. Water and olive oil (a variant uses also white wine) are added. Oil and salt and pepper to taste are sprinkled on them. Then the pan is covered and they are braised until the liquid has evaporated. One may eat them warm or at room temperature.

== See also ==
- Roman cuisine
- Carciofi alla giudia

== Sources ==
- Boni, Ada (1985). La Cucina regionale italiana (in Italian). Roma: Newton Compton Editori.
- Cordia, Allen (2013). Health and Food Sciences. Buffalo: Sampton Publishing House.
