= Carciofi alla giudia =

Roman Jewish artichoke dish

Carciofi alla giudìa
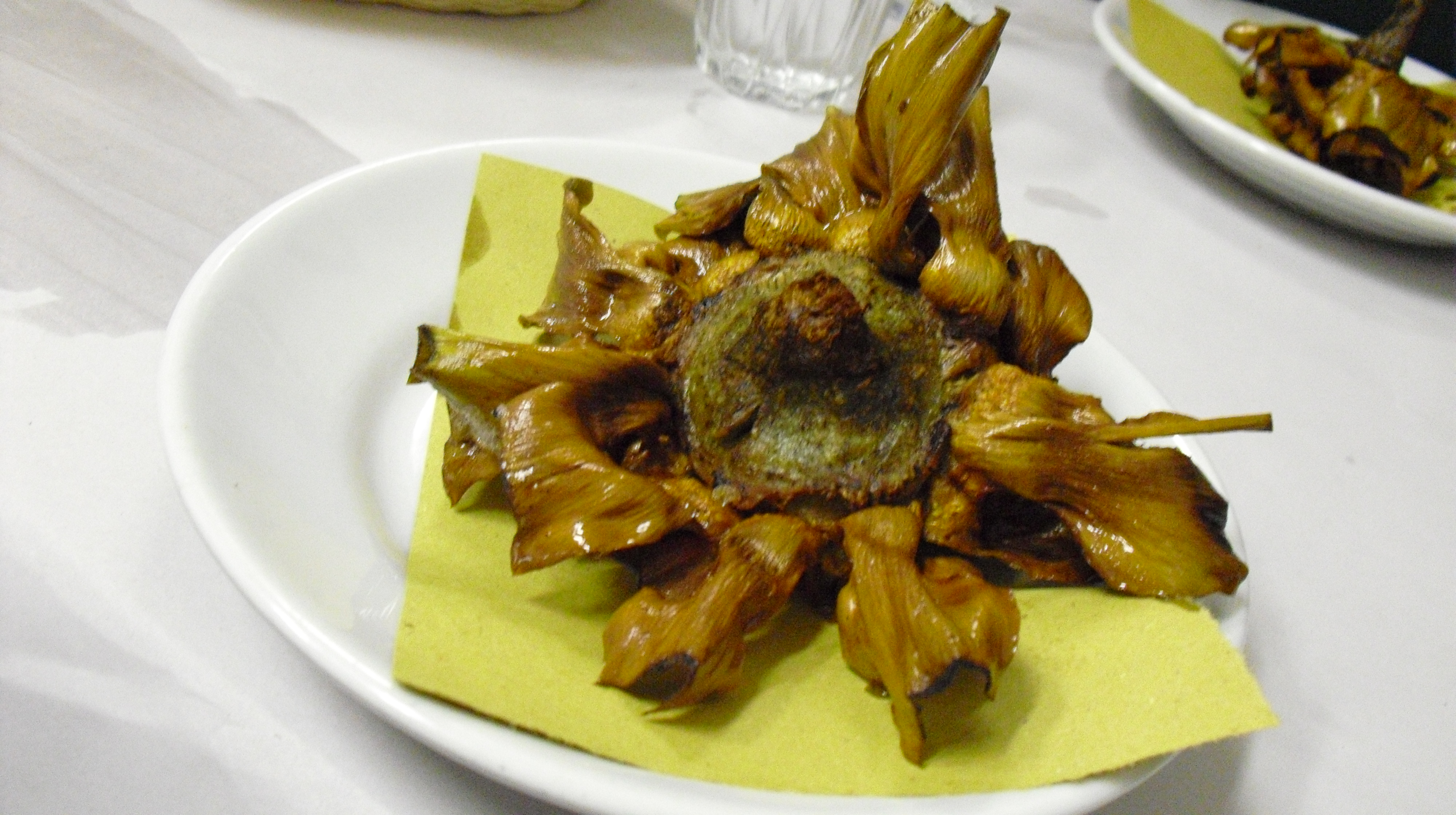
- Alternative names: Carciofi alla giudea
- Course: Antipasto
- Place of origin: Italy
- Region or state: Rome
- Created by: Roman Jews
- Serving temperature: Warm
- Main ingredients: Artichokes

Carciofi alla giudìa (Italian: [karˈtʃɔːfi alla dʒuˈdiːa]; lit. 'Jewish-style artichokes') is among the best-known dishes of Roman Jewish cuisine. It is essentially a deep-fried artichoke, and the recipe originated in the Jewish community of Rome, giudìo being the exonym for the Jewish people in the Romanesco language.

The dish is a speciality of the Roman Ghetto, where it is served by Jewish restaurants in the springtime. It involves a two-step deep-frying technique. First, the artichokes are fried at a low temperature to soften them. Then, after their leaves are spread open, they are fried again at a higher temperature. This process results in artichokes with a golden color and crispy, flower-like leaves.

In English, the dish is usually referred to with the standard Italian spelling carciofi alla giudea; this spelling may be found in Italian sources as well, but the Roman dialect name is much more commonly used.

== Preparation ==
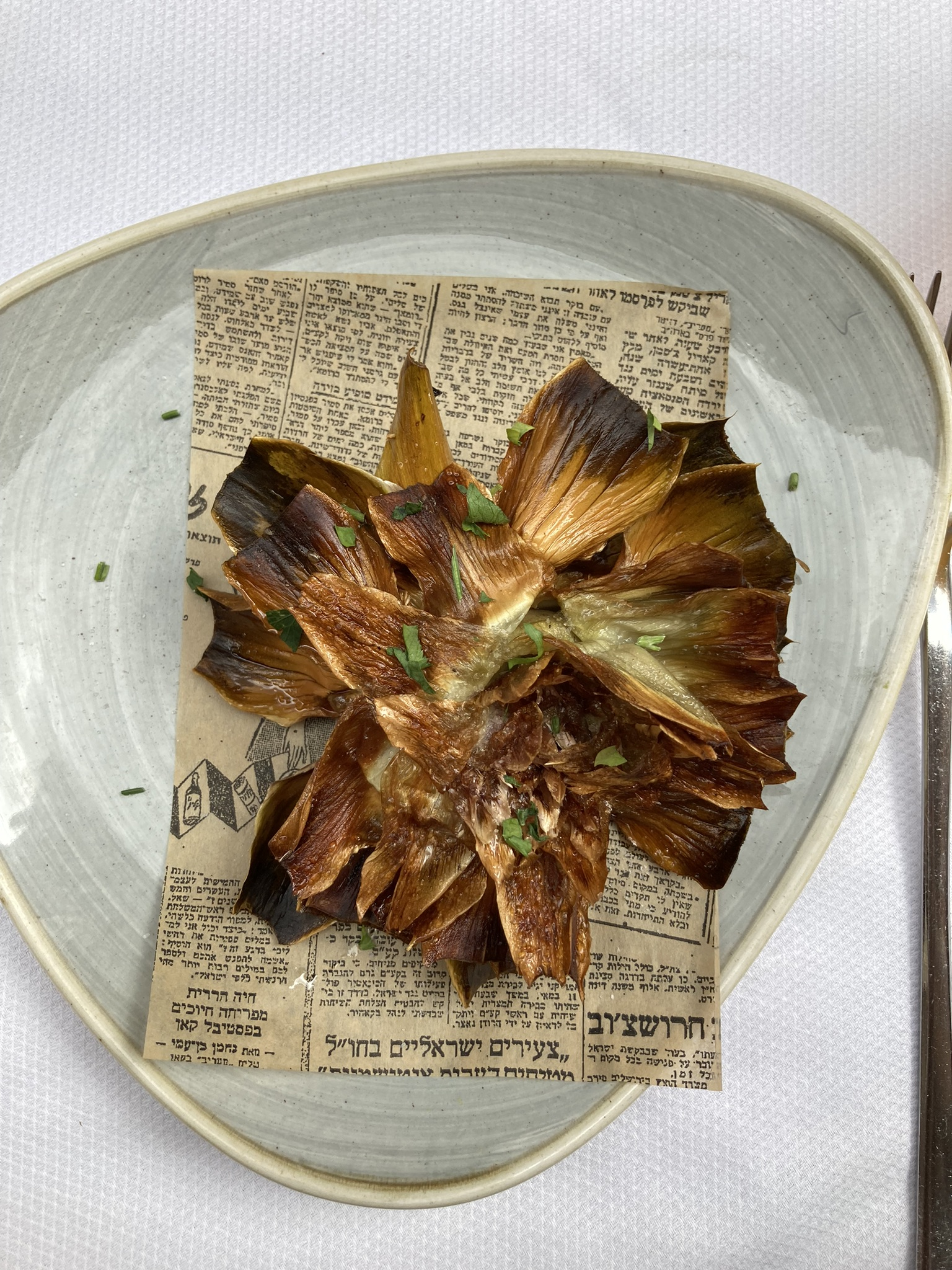
Carciofi alla giudia

Artichokes of the Romanesco variety are commonly used for this dish. They are cleaned with a sharp knife to eliminate the hard external leaves, beaten to open them, left for some minutes in water with lemon juice to prevent discolouration, then seasoned with salt and pepper and deep fried in olive oil. Once they are cooked, a little cold water is sprinkled on them to make them crisp. They are eaten warm; the leaves have a nutty crunchiness.

== Kashrut ==
In 2018, the Chief Rabbinate of Israel declared that carciofi alla giudia are not kosher, since the dense leaves could conceal non-kosher insects. This sowed consternation among Roman Jews, who resisted the declaration, argued that the artichokes used for this signature dish have leaves so tight that insects cannot enter, and emphasized the importance and deep cultural roots of the dish for the Italian Jewish community.

== See also ==
- Jewish cuisine
- List of Jewish cuisine dishes
- Roman cuisine
- Italian Jews
- Carciofi alla romana

== Sources ==
- Boni, Ada (1983) [1930]. La Cucina Romana (in Italian). Roma: Newton Compton Editori.
- Cervellati, Alessandro (1973). Bologna futurista (in Italian). Bologna: A cura dell'Autore.
- David, Elizabeth (1987). Italian Food. London: Barrie & Jenkins ISBN 0-7126-2000-1 (1st: London: Macdonald, 1954).
- Gray, Rose, and Ruth Rogers (1995). The River Cafe Cookbook. London: Ebury Press.
- Malizia, Giuliano (1995). La Cucina Ebraico-Romanesca (in Italian). Roma: Newton Compton Editori.
- Davidson, Alan (1999). The Oxford Companion to Food. Oxford: University Press.
