= Coda alla vaccinara =

Oxtail stew in modern Roman cuisine

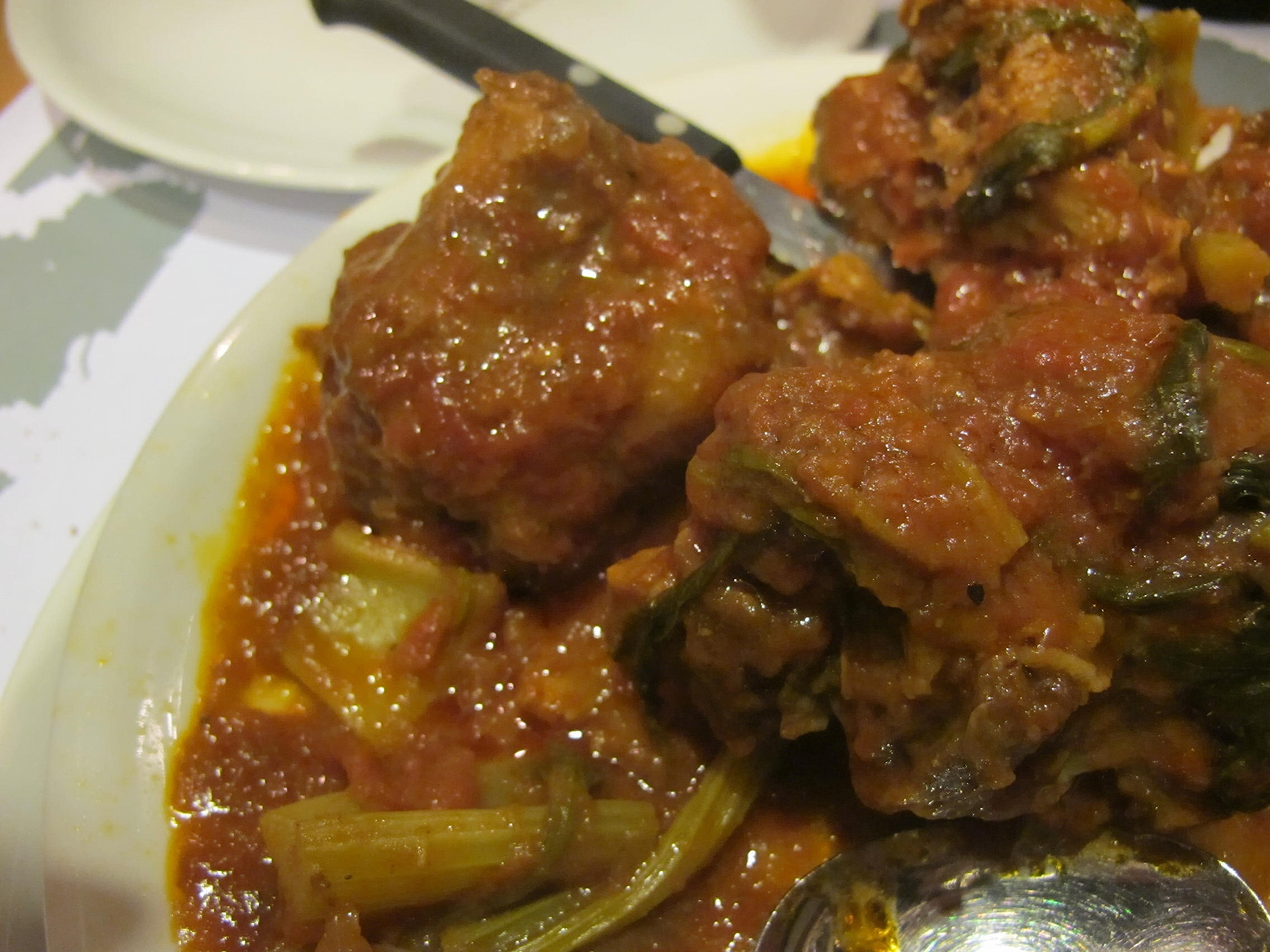
- Course: Secondo (Italian course)
- Place of origin: Italy
- Region or state: Lazio
- Main ingredients: Oxtail, celery, carrot
- Variations: Rigatoni al sugo di coda

Coda alla vaccinara (Italian: [ˈkoːda alla vattʃiˈnaːra]) is an oxtail stew in modern Roman cuisine including various vegetables, notably celery. The tail is considered offal, nicknamed in Rome the quinto quarto (lit. 'fifth fourth').

== Preparation ==
The oxtail is parboiled and then simmered with large amounts of celery (typically 1.5 kilograms of celery for every kilogram of tail), carrots, and aromatic herbs. Tomatoes and red wine are added, and then the mixture is cooked further with a soffritto of onions, garlic, prosciutto, pancetta, and some other ingredients. During the final phase of cooking, a bouquet garni of bay leaves, celery stalks, and cloves is put in the pot for flavouring. It is cooked until the meat easily separates from the bones. It is seasoned with cinnamon, nutmeg, and black pepper and garnished with pine nuts.

Coda is usually prepared to taste sweet and sour, usually using raisins, or sometimes candied fruit or a small amount of grated bittersweet chocolate. Coda is generally prepared in advance and reheated. Leftovers can be used as a sauce for rigatoni, which is then named "rigatoni al sugo di coda".

== History ==
Coda alla vaccinara was originally the specialty of the vaccinari ('butchers') of the Rione Regola in Rome, to the point that the inhabitants of that rione were nicknamed in Romanesco dialect magnacode ('tail-eaters'). It is often found in the trattorie of Testaccio and Trastevere.

== Popular culture ==
Coda is the favourite dish of the protagonist Giacinto Mazzatella (Nino Manfredi) in Down and Dirty. He expresses his appreciation of the dish with the words "Oxtail and celery are like man and woman. It's all well when one sticks to the other."

== See also ==
- List of beef dishes
