= Amatriciana =

Italian pasta sauce

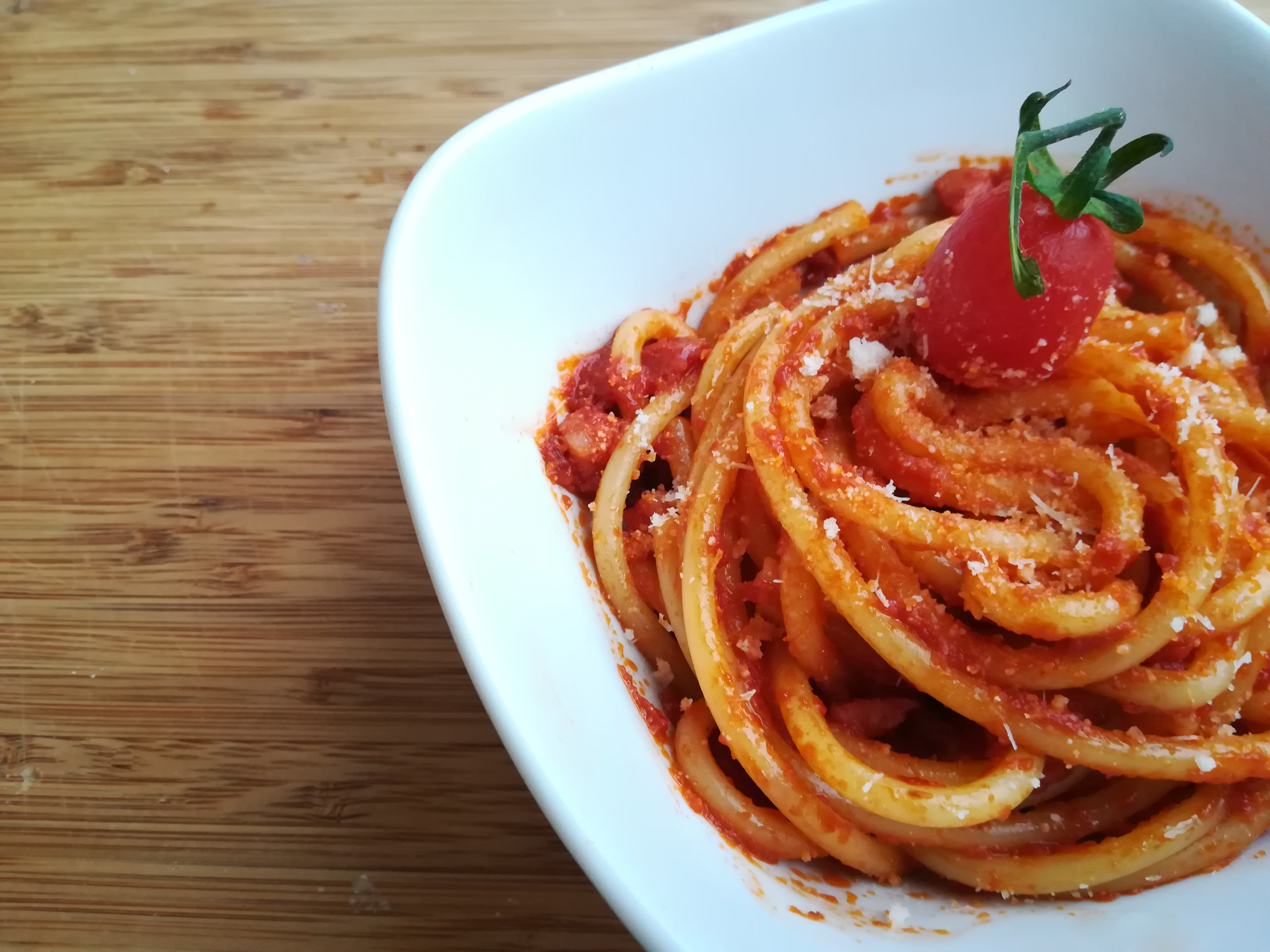
- Bucatini all'amatriciana
- Type: Sauce
- Place of origin: Italy
- Region or state: Amatrice (province of Rieti), Lazio
- Main ingredients: Tomatoes, guanciale, pecorino, black pepper, chili pepper, extra virgin olive oil, dry white wine
- Variations: Onion, garlic, strutto, peperoncino

Amatriciana (matriciana in Romanesco dialect) is a sauce made with tomatoes, guanciale (cured pork cheek), pecorino romano or pecorino di Amatrice cheese, black pepper, dried chili pepper, extra virgin olive oil, dry white wine, and salt.

Originating in the comune (municipality) of Amatrice (in the mountainous province of Rieti of the Lazio region), amatriciana is one of the best-known pasta sauces in present-day Roman and Italian cuisine. The Italian government has named it a prodotto agroalimentare tradizionale (PAT) of Lazio, and amatriciana tradizionale is registered as a traditional speciality guaranteed (TSG) in the EU and the UK.

== Development ==
Amatriciana derives from a dish called pasta alla gricia. The origin of the word gricia is unclear. In papal Rome, the grici were sellers of common edible foods, who got this name because many of them came from Valtellina, at that time a possession of the Swiss canton of Grigioni. According to another hypothesis, it is named after the frazione (hamlet) of Grisciano, in the comune (municipality) of Accumoli, near Amatrice. The sauce—nowadays also named amatriciana bianca—was, and still is, prepared with guanciale (cured pork cheek) and grated pecorino. At some point, a little olive oil was added to the recipe. In the 1960s, amatriciana sauce was still prepared in this way in Amatrice itself.

The invention of the first tomato sauces (and the probably earliest date for the introduction of tomato in the gricia, creating amatriciana) dates to the late 18th century. Tomatoes were introduced to Europe through the Columbian Exchange via Spain. The first written record of pasta with tomato sauce can be found in the 1790 cookbook L'Apicio Moderno by Roman chef Francesco Leonardi.

== History ==
The earliest known written attestations of the name date from the early 20th century. In 1911, Eugenio Rontini's I briganti celebri italiani mentioned "spaghetti alla matriciana", although the dish was described as being seasoned only with pepper and pecorino cheese. Linguist Giulio Vaccaro therefore notes that the preparation described by Rontini was essentially cacio e pepe rather than modern amatriciana.

The earliest known occurrence of the expression "spaghetti all'amatriciana" accompanied by a recipe dates to 1914, in Amedeo Pettini's Manuale di cucina e di pasticceria. Pettini, who served as a chef to the Italian royal household, described a sauce made by frying ventresca (pork belly), adding tomato sauce diluted with broth, and serving it with grated cheese. Although the recipe differs from later versions, notably in its use of pork belly rather than guanciale, it is the earliest known written recipe explicitly bearing the name amatriciana.

The dish subsequently appeared in the Touring Club Italiano's 1925 guide and in Ada Boni's La cucina romana (1930). Boni also distinguished tomato-based amatriciana from a tomato-free preparation called "spaghetti alla marchiciana", corresponding substantially to the dish now known as pasta alla gricia.

between Rome and Amatrice. The recipe was well received and became a classic of Roman cuisine, although it originated elsewhere. The name of the dish in the Romanesco dialect eventually became matriciana due to the apheresis typical of this dialect.

Although gricia (which does not contain tomatoes) is still prepared in central Italy, it is amatriciana—enriched with tomatoes—that is best known throughout Italy and abroad. While in Amatrice the dish is prepared with spaghetti, bucatini is now most commonly used in Rome.

== Variants ==
The recipe is known in several variants depending, among other things, on the availability of ingredients. In Amatrice, the use of guanciale and tomato is typical and onion is not favoured, although it is shown in the classical handbooks of Roman cuisine. The former mayor of Amatrice, Sergio Pirozzi, went so far as to say, "Garlic in amatriciana, never. And no onion, either, whatever some may say." When the celebrity chef Carlo Cracco stated that an unpeeled clove of garlic could be sautéd with the other ingredients and removed before serving, calling it his "secret ingredient", the municipal government of Amatrice retorted on its official website that "the only ingredients in a true amatriciana sauce are guanciale, pecorino, white wine, San Marzano tomatoes, black pepper and chili pepper". For frying, olive oil is most commonly used, but strutto (lard) is used as well. For cheese either pecorino romano or pecorino di Amatrice (from the Sibillini Mountains or Monti della Laga areas) can be used.

== See also ==
- List of sauces

== Bibliography ==
- Blasi, Benedetto (1923). Vie piazze e ville di Roma nel loro valore storico e topografico (in Italian). Roma: Libreria di scienze e lettere.
- Boni, Ada (1983) [1930]. La Cucina Romana (in Italian). Roma: Newton Compton Editori.
- Gosetti Della Salda, Anna (1967). Le ricette regionali italiane (in Italian). Milano: Solares.
- Carnacina, Luigi; Buonassisi, Vincenzo (1975). Roma in Cucina (in Italian). Milano: Giunti Martello.
- Faccioli, Emilio (1987). L'Arte della cucina in Italia (in Italian). Milano: Einaudi.
- Ravaro, Fernando (2005). Dizionario romanesco (in Italian). Roma: Newton Compton. ISBN 9788854117921.
- Zanini De Vita, Oretta; Fant, Maureen B. (2013). Sauces & Shapes: Pasta the Italian Way. New York: W. W. Norton & Company. ISBN 978-0-393-08243-2.
