= Roman cuisine =

Local cuisine in and around the city of Rome

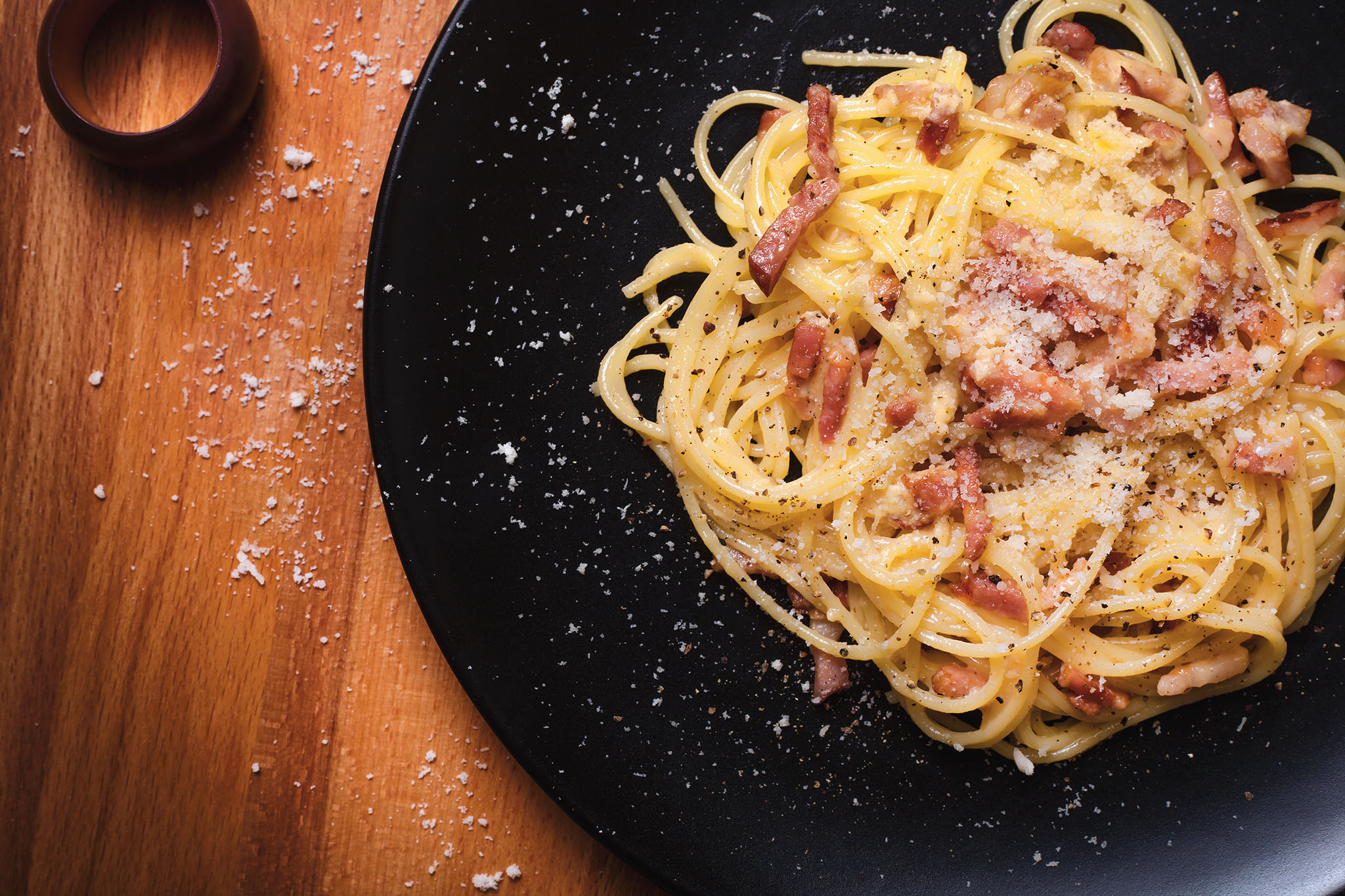
Carbonara

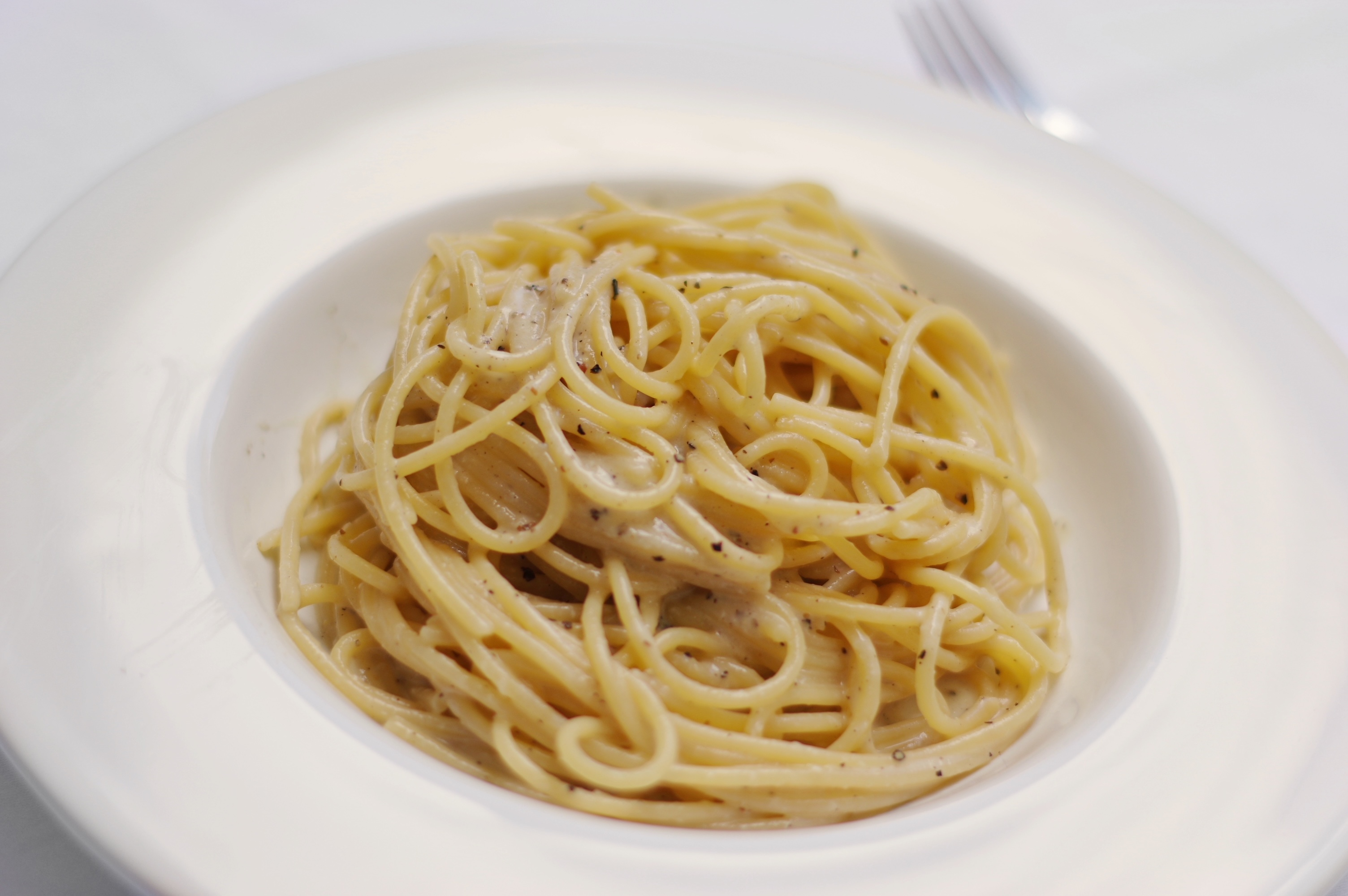
Spaghetti cacio e pepe

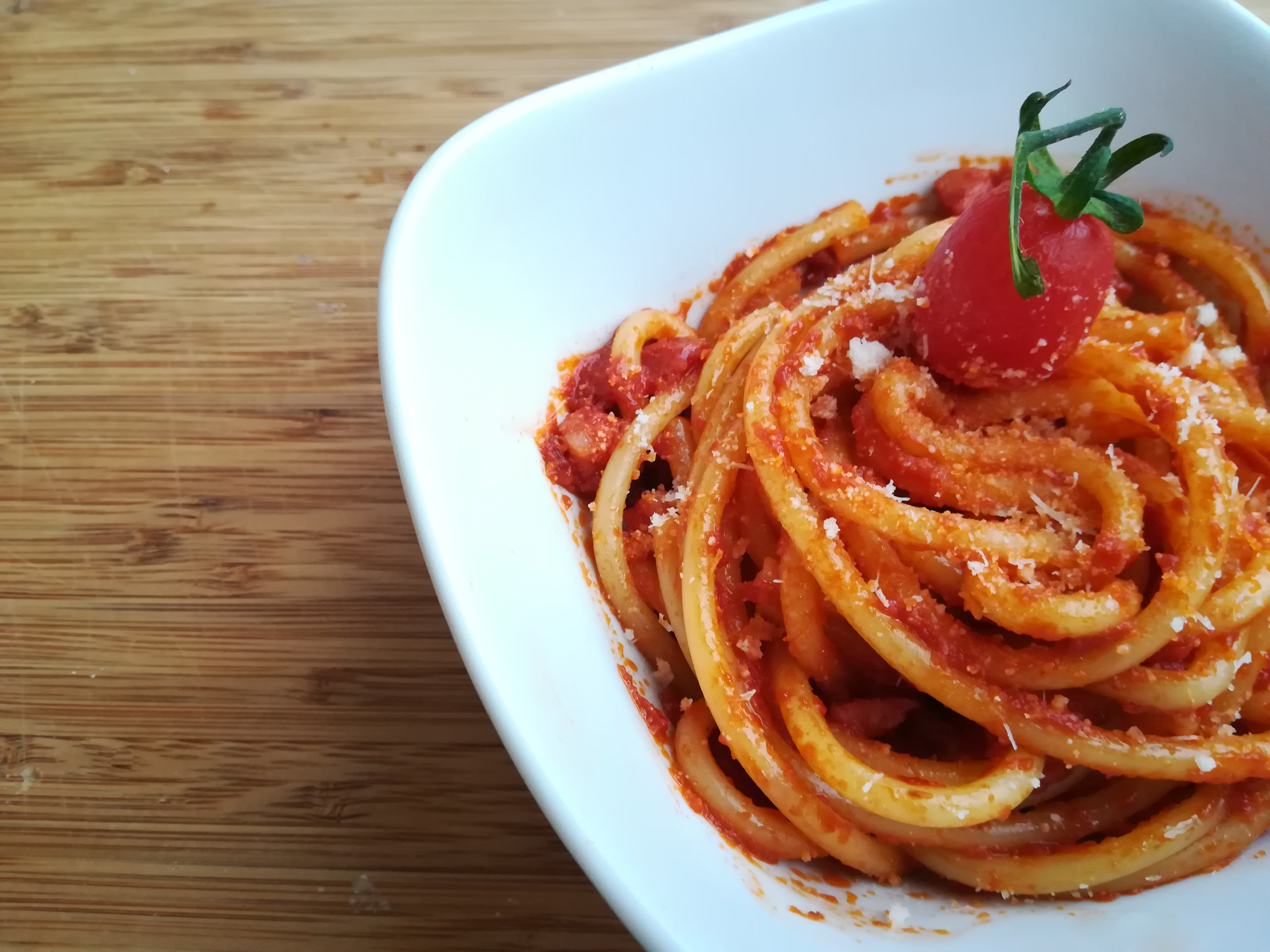
Bucatini with amatriciana

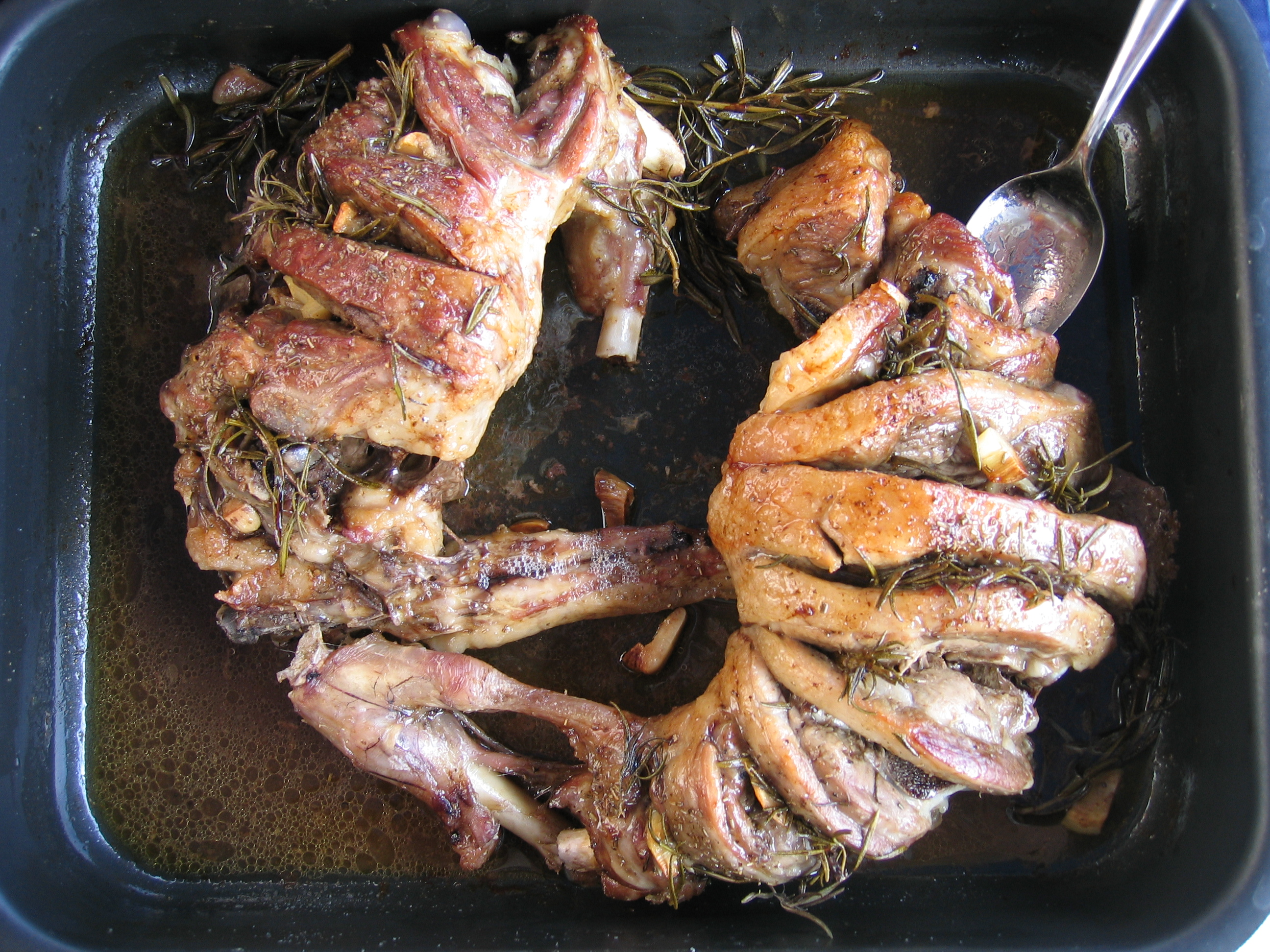
Abbacchio, a lamb preparation from the Italian Easter tradition

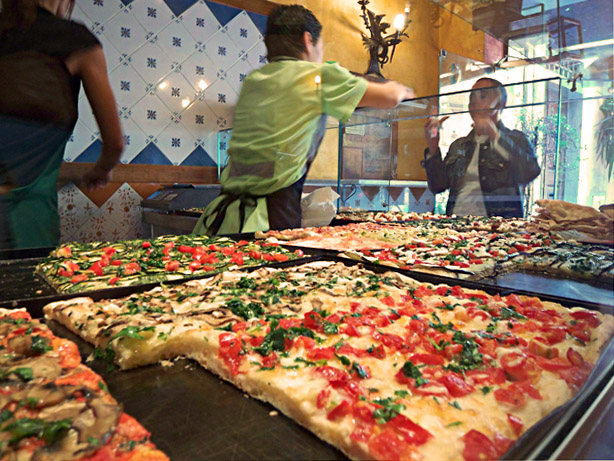
Pizza al taglio

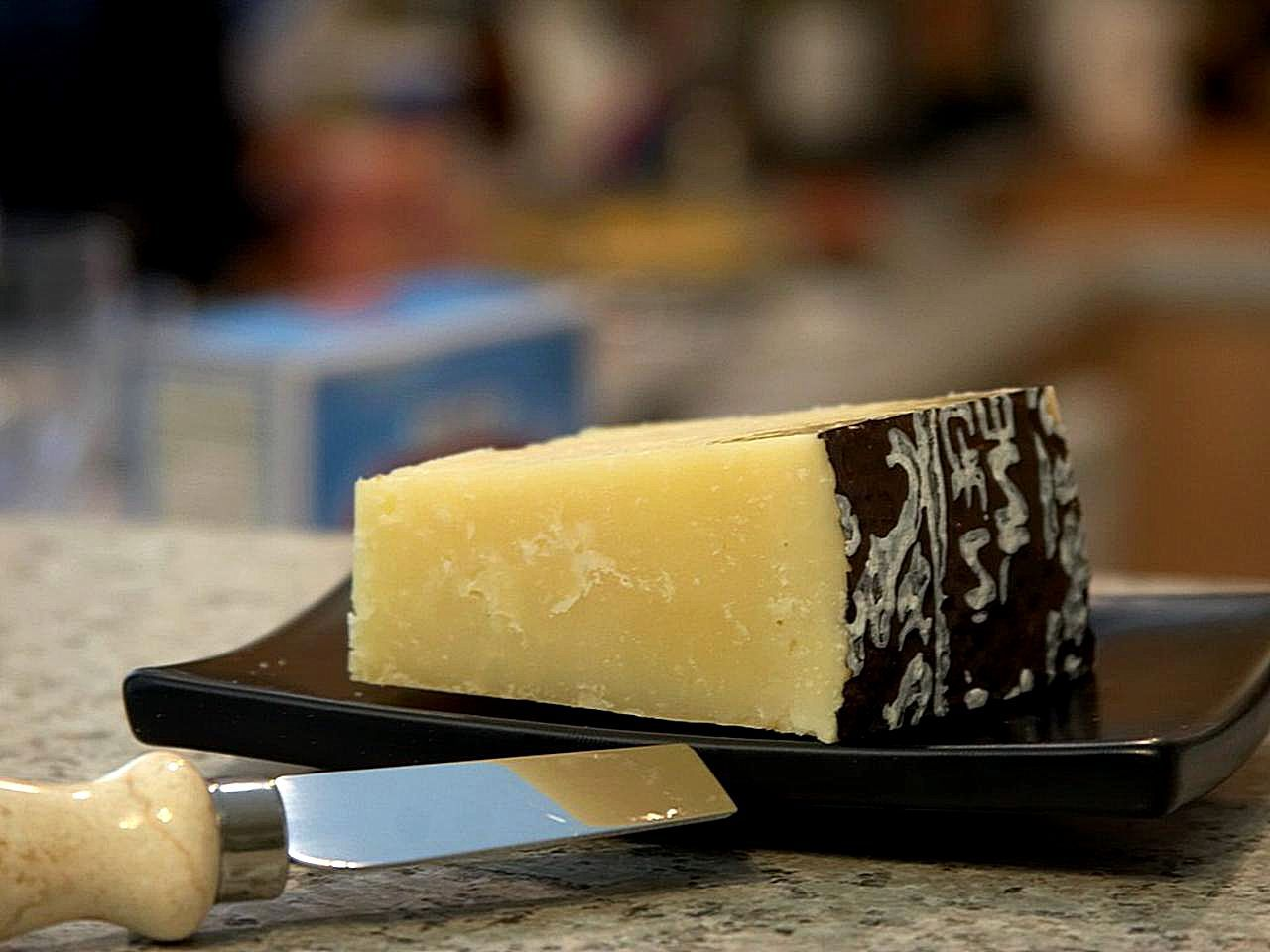
Pecorino romano

Roman cuisine is the cooking traditions and practices of the Italian city of Rome. It features fresh, seasonal and simply-prepared ingredients from the Roman Campagna. These include peas, globe artichokes and fava beans, shellfish, milk-fed lamb and goat, and cheeses such as pecorino romano and ricotta. Olive oil is used mostly to dress raw vegetables, while strutto (pork lard) and fat from prosciutto are preferred for frying. The most popular sweets in Rome are small individual pastries called pasticcini, gelato and handmade chocolates and candies. Special dishes are often reserved for different days of the week; for example, gnocchi is eaten on Thursdays, baccalà (salted cod) on Fridays and trippa (offal) on Saturdays.

== Overview ==
It features fresh, seasonal and simply-prepared ingredients from Roman Campagna. These include peas, globe artichokes and fava beans, shellfish, milk-fed lamb and goat, and cheeses such as pecorino romano and ricotta. Olive oil is used mostly to dress raw vegetables, while strutto (pork lard) and fat from prosciutto are preferred for frying. The most popular sweets in Rome are small individual pastries called pasticcini, gelato and handmade chocolates and candies. Special dishes are often reserved for different days of the week; for example, gnocchi is eaten on Thursdays, baccalà (salted cod) on Fridays, and trippa (lit. 'tripe') on Saturdays.

Pasta dishes based on the use of guanciale (unsmoked bacon prepared with pig's jowl or cheeks) are often found in Lazio, such as carbonara pasta and amatriciana pasta. Another pasta dish of the region is arrabbiata, with spicy tomato sauce. The regional cuisine widely use offal, resulting in dishes such as the entrail-based rigatoni with pajata sauce and coda alla vaccinara. Abbacchio is a meat dish based on lamb from the Roman cuisine.

Iconic of Lazio is cheese made from ewes' milk (pecorino romano), pizza al taglio, porchetta (savory, fatty, and moist boneless pork roast) and Frascati white wine. The influence of the ancient Jewish community can be noticed in the Roman cuisine's traditional carciofi alla giudia.

== History ==
Rome's food has evolved through centuries and periods of social, cultural and political changes. Rome became a major gastronomical center during the ancient age. Ancient Roman cuisine was mainly based on cereals, cheeses, legumes and fruit. Subsequently, the empire's enormous expansion exposed Romans to many new, provincial culinary habits and cooking techniques. In the beginning, the differences between social classes were not very great, but disparities developed with the empire's growth. Later, during the Italian Renaissance, Rome became well known as a center of high-cuisine, since some of the best chefs of the time worked for the popes. An example of this could be Bartolomeo Scappi, who was a chef working for Pope Pius IV in the Vatican kitchen, reaching fame with his cookbook Opera dell'arte del cucinare, published in 1570. Here he lists approximately 1,000 recipes of Renaissance cuisine and describes cooking techniques and tools, giving the first known picture of a fork. Roman and all Italian cuisine were transformationally influenced by the introduction of new world crops by the Spanish, especially the tomato.

== Traditional cucina romana ==
The Testaccio rione, Rome's trade and slaughterhouse area, is the place where Rome's most original and traditional foods can still be found. The area was often known as the "belly" or "slaughterhouse" of Rome, and was inhabited by butchers, or vaccinari. The most common or ancient Roman cuisine included the quinto quarto (lit. 'fifth quarter'). Popular foods include pig's trotters, brain and the genitals of other animals, which were often carefully cooked and richly spiced with different savouries, spices and herbs. The old-fashioned coda alla vaccinara (oxtail cooked in the way of butchers) is still one of the city's most popular meals and is part of most of Rome's restaurants' menus. Lamb is also a very popular part of Roman cuisine, and is often roasted with spices and herbs. There is a considerable Jewish influence in Roman cuisine, since many Jews lived in the city, and some of the traditional meals of the ghetto date back over 400 years. Such include the carciofi alla giudia (Jewish-style artichokes) and the pizza dolce di Beridde.

== Pasta in Rome ==
Pasta is one important element of Roman cuisine. Famous Roman pasta dishes include cacio e pepe (cheese and black pepper), gricia (a sauce made with guanciale and hard cheese, typically pecorino romano), carbonara (like gricia but with the addition of egg) and amatriciana (like gricia but with the addition of tomato). Fettuccine Alfredo (invented in Rome by the chef of restaurant Alfredo alla Scrofa) is famous abroad, but not considered traditional and mostly unheard of in Rome. Rome's most common pasta shape is spaghetti, but there are many other forms.

== Beverages ==
The city is known as a center of white wine. Frascati and Roman Castles have been called the best ones in the city.

== Desserts ==
There are also many desserts and sweets in Roman cuisine, many of which are made with ricotta cheese. Typical of Rome is the grattachecca, a type of shaved ice.

== Dishes ==
Name	Image	Description
Abbacchio alla romana		It is a preparation of lamb typical of the Roman cuisine. It is consumed throughout central Italy as an Easter and Christmas dish. Abbacchio is a product protected by the European Union with the PGI mark. In Romanesco dialect, the offspring of the sheep who is still suckling or recently weaned is called abbacchio, while the offspring of the sheep almost a year old who has already been shorn twice is called agnello (lit. 'lamb'). This distinction exists only in the Romanesco dialect.
Bucatini all'amatriciana		A sauce made with tomatoes, guanciale (cured pork cheek), pecorino romano cheese, black pepper, extra virgin olive oil, dry white wine, and salt. Originating in the comune (municipality) of Amatrice (in the mountainous province of Rieti of the Lazio region), amatriciana is one of the best known pasta sauces in present-day Roman and Italian cuisine.
Bruschetta		An appetizer (antipasto) consisting of grilled bread topped with garlic, olive oil, and salt. Most commonly it is served with toppings of tomatoes, vegetables, beans, cured meat or cheese.
Cacio e pepe		A pasta dish typical of the Lazio region of Italy. Cacio e pepe means 'cheese and pepper' in several central Italian dialects. The dish contains grated pecorino romano and black pepper.
Carbonara		A pasta dish made with fatty cured pork, hard cheese, eggs, salt, and black pepper.
Carciofi alla giudia		It is among the best-known dishes of Roman Jewish cuisine. The recipe is essentially a deep-fried artichoke, and originated in the Jewish community of Rome, giudìo being the term for Jew in the Romanesco language.
Carciofi alla romana		It is a typical dish of Roman cuisine of pan braised artichokes. During spring-time in Rome, the dish is prepared in each household and is served in all restaurants.
Coda alla vaccinara		It is an oxtail stew in modern Roman cuisine including various vegetables, notably celery. The tail is considered offal, nicknamed in Rome the quinto quarto (lit. 'fifth fourth').
Coppiette		Stripes of dried meat (pork or horse), usually spicy
Crostata di ricotta		It is a baked tart or pie. It is made with ricotta cheese mixed with sugar and lemon zest, and which may additionally include cocoa or raisins.
Fiori di zucca		Zucchini flowers filled with mozzarella and anchovies, battered and deep-fried
Gnocchi alla romana		They are prepared with gnocchi made of semolina, whole milk, butter, and Parmesan cheese, seasoned with salt and black pepper.
Maritozzi		They are made with an enriched dough bread roll that is split after baking and cooling and filled with cream. They are enriched buns, made with dried fruit and filled with whipped cream.
Pasta alla gricia		According to one hypothesis, the name of the dish derives from the Romanesco word gricio. In papal Rome, the grici were sellers of common foods, and got this name because many of them came from Valtellina, at that time possession of the Swiss canton of Grigioni. Pasta alla gricia then would mean pasta prepared with the simple ingredients (guanciale, pecorino romano, and black pepper) readily available at the local gricio.
Penne all'arrabbiata		It is a spicy sauce made with tomatoes, garlic, peperoncino, parsley, and extra virgin olive oil. The sauce originates from the Lazio region of Italy, and particularly from the city of Rome.
Rigatoni con la pajata		Pagliata (or, in Romanesco dialect, pajata) is a traditional Roman dish primarily using the intestine of a young calf (tripe). As it has only eaten milk, the resulting dish is similar to cheese in a sausage casing. The classic preparation includes pagliata accompanied by rigatoni in rigatoni con la pajata (Romanesco dialect; standard Italian: rigatoni con la pagliata).
Saltimbocca alla romana		Saltimbocca is an Italian dish (also popular in southern Switzerland). It consists of veal that has been wrapped (lined) with prosciutto and sage and then marinated in wine, oil or salt water, depending on the region or one's own taste. The original version of this dish is saltimbocca alla romana which consists of veal, prosciutto and sage, rolled up and cooked in dry white wine and butter. Marsala is sometimes used. Also, sometimes the veal and prosciutto are not rolled up but left flat.
Scaloppine alla romana		Scaloppine (plural and diminutive of scaloppa—a small escalope, i.e., a thinly sliced cut of meat) consists of thinly sliced meat, most often beef, veal, or chicken, that is dredged in wheat flour and sautéed in one of a variety of reduction sauces. The sauce accompanying scaloppine can come in many varieties according to regional gastronomic traditions. Popular variations include tomato-wine reduction; scaloppine al limone or piccata, which denotes a caper-and-lemon sauce; scaloppine ai funghi, a mushroom-wine reduction; and pizzaiola, a pizza-style tomato sauce.
Supplì		Supplì (Italianization of the French word surprise) are snacks consisting of a ball of rice (generally risotto) with tomato sauce, typical of Roman cuisine. Some believe that they derive from the French croquettes and were introduced to Rome by the French troops of Napoleon at the beginning of the 19th century.
Trippa alla romana		Once a popular dish among the poorest inhabitants of Rome, trippa alla romana has become a staple of Roman cuisine. It is part of quinto quarto (lit. 'fifth quarter', or the offal of butchered animals), a type of cuisine born from poor, peasant kitchens. Each animal was divided into quarters (quarti); the first quarter (primo quarto) consisted of the best cuts and these went to the nobility. The second quarter was for the clergy. The third quarter (terzo quarto) was for the bourgeois (or merchant) class, and the fourth quarter was for soldiers. All that was leftover became quinto quarto and was distributed among the rest of the population, including the vaccinari (butchers). Trippa alla romana is an ancient recipe, traditionally prepared during Saturday lunch, so much so that nowadays in historic trattorias it is possible to see a sign that says "Sabato Trippa". The dish is prepared with tripe, white onions, peeled tomatoes, carrots, white wine, pecorino romano cheese and pennyroyal leaves.

== See also ==
- Italian cuisine
- Cuisine of Abruzzo
- Apulian cuisine
- Arbëreshë cuisine
- Emilian cuisine
- Cuisine of Liguria
- Lombard cuisine
- Cuisine of Mantua
- Cuisine of Basilicata
- Neapolitan cuisine
- Piedmontese cuisine
- Cuisine of Sardinia
- Sicilian cuisine
- Tuscan cuisine
- Venetian cuisine

== Bibliography ==
- Boni, Ada (1983) [1930]. LaCucina Romana (in Italian). Roma: Newton Compton Editori.
- Carnacina, Luigi; Bonassisi, Vincenzo (1975). Roma in Cucina (in Italian). Milano: Giunti Martello.
- Piras, Claudia; Medagliani, Eugenio (2000). Culinaria Italy. Könemann Verlagsgesellschaft mbh. ISBN 3-8290-2901-2.
- Malizia, Giuliano (1995). La Cucina Ebraico-Romanesca (in Italian). Roma: Newton Compton Editori.
- Rome. Eyewitness Travel. DK Publishing. 2006. ISBN 1-4053-1090-1.
