= Cuisine of Rome =

Cuisine of Rome may refer to:

- Ancient Roman cuisine, the food, drink and eating traditions of the ancient Romans
- Roman cuisine, the food, traditional dishes and eating habits in the modern city of Rome
