= Chitarra =

Chitarra can refer to:

- Guitar, modern string instrument
- Gittern, medieval string instrument
- Spaghetti alla chitarra, a variety of egg pasta
