= Trippa alla romana =

Traditional dish in Roman cuisine

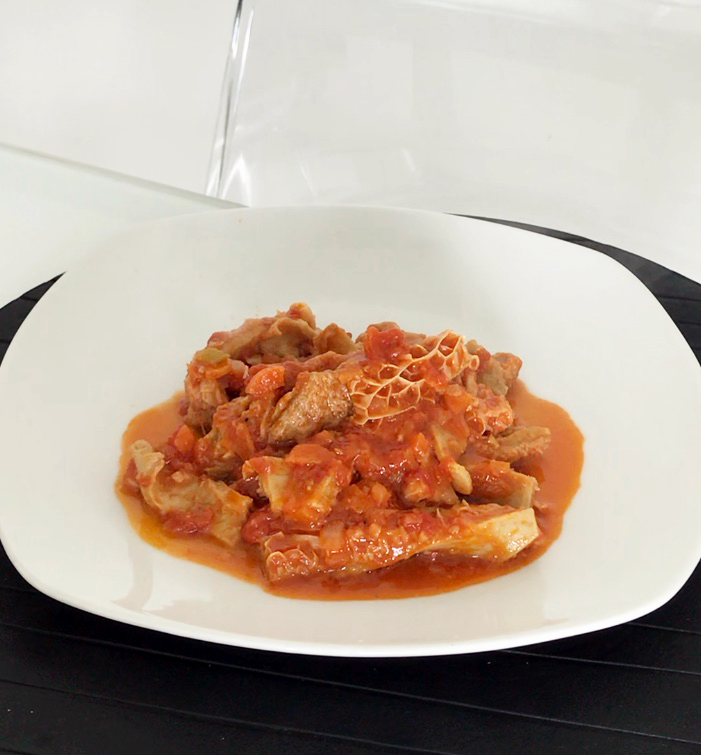
Trippa alla romana

Trippa alla romana is a traditional dish of Roman cuisine. It consists of beef tripe cooked in a tomato sauce.

== History ==
Once a popular dish among the poorest inhabitants of Rome, trippa alla romana has become a staple of Roman cuisine. It is part of quinto quarto (lit. 'fifth quarter', or the offal of butchered animals), a type of cuisine born from poor, peasant kitchens. Each animal was divided into quarters (quarti); the first quarter (primo quarto) consisted of the best cuts and these went to the nobility. The second quarter was for the clergy. The third quarter (terzo quarto) was for the bourgeois (or merchant) class, and the fourth quarter was for soldiers. All that was leftover became quinto quarto and was distributed among the rest of the population, including the vaccinari (butchers).

Trippa alla romana is an ancient recipe, traditionally prepared during Saturday lunch, so much so that nowadays in historic trattorias it is possible to see a sign that says "Sabato Trippa".

The recipe of trippa alla romana has also spread thanks to Elena Fabrizi, an admirer of the popular dish of the Roman tradition.

The dish is prepared with tripe, white onions, peeled tomatoes, carrots, white wine, pecorino romano cheese and pennyroyal leaves.

== See also ==
- Trippa
