= Abbacchio =

Italian lamb dish

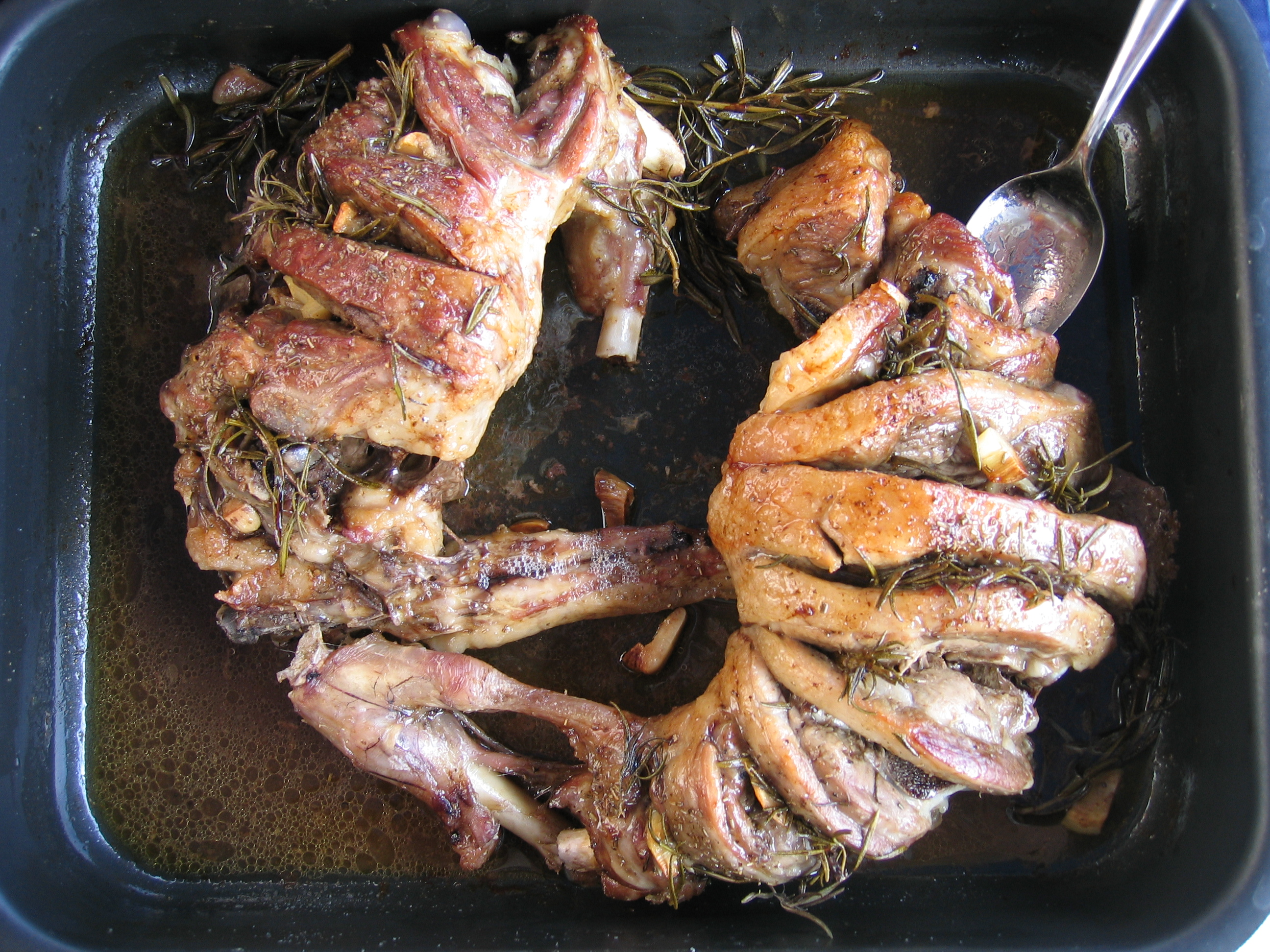
- Abbacchio alla romana
- Type: Meat
- Course: Secondo (Italian course)
- Place of origin: Italy
- Region or state: Lazio
- Associated cuisine: Roman cuisine
- Main ingredients: Lamb
- Ingredients generally used: (optional): garlic, olive oil, ham, rosemary, vinegar, salt, black pepper

Abbacchio (Italian: [abˈbakkjo]) is an Italian preparation of lamb typical of the Roman cuisine. It is consumed throughout central Italy as an Easter and Christmas dish. Abbacchio is a product protected by the European Union with the PGI mark.

== Terminology ==
In Romanesco dialect, the offspring of the sheep which is still suckling or recently weaned is called abbacchio, while the offspring of the sheep almost a year old who has already been shorn twice is called agnello (lit. 'lamb'). This distinction exists only in the Romanesco dialect.

== Etymology ==
There are disagreements regarding the origin of the term:

- etymologically it can be traced back to abecula or avecula, in turn deriving from ovacula or ovecula, diminutive of the Latin ovis (sheep);
- it can be derived from the Latin term ad baculum, 'near the stick', to indicate the suckling lamb, not yet weaned and which, as such, is still used today to be tied to a stick stuck in the ground (ad baculum), in order to force the mother to remain nearby without moving away;
- it can also originate from the Italian term abbacchiare, in the sense of killing, killing with the stick (from the Latin baculum, therefore a lamb that is close to being killed ad baculum, 'near the stick').

== History ==
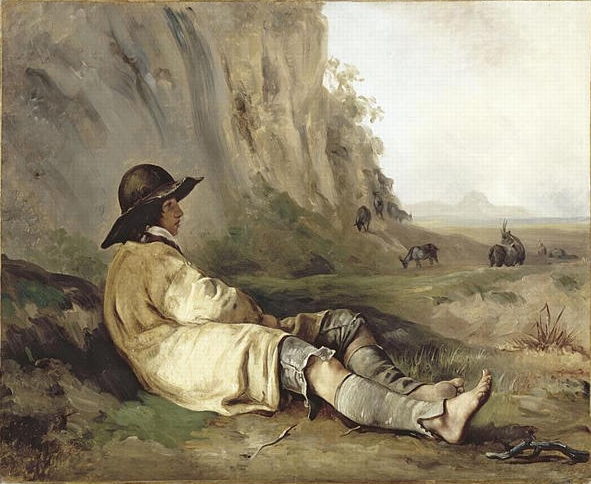
Pastore nella campagna romana (lit. 'Shepherd in the Roman countryside') by Jacques Raymond Brascassat (19th century)

Throughout central Italy, including Sardinia, pastoralism was the main source of meat. Since ancient times, abbacchio has been one of the staple foods of the Lazio region, especially for rural communities, whose consumption at the table was considerable. The tradition of consuming abbacchio spread in ancient times where mainly adult sheep were slaughtered.

The slaughter of abbacchio was forbidden except during the Easter and Christmas periods, and until June. Over the centuries, given the importance of the food, around 100 recipes for preparing lamb have been developed in Lazio.

Given the importance of abbacchio in social life, historical events dedicated to abbacchio are still organized in the Lazio region today, i.e. sagre, country festivals and popular events. In ancient times, sheep was eaten during work in the countryside, while abbacchio was consumed only during the Easter holidays.

== Classification and festivals ==
According to the classification of Sardinian Lamb PGI, abbacchio is a suckling lamb that is a little over a month old and up to 7 kg (15 lb) in weight. Slaughter must be carried out on male or female lambs between 28 and 40 days of age.

In Roiate, comune (municipality) in the Metropolitan City of Rome Capital located about 45 kilometres (28 mi) east of Rome, the Sagra dell'abbacchio, celebrating this dish, is organized annually. Abbacchio is a product protected by the European Union with the PGI mark.

== Recipes ==
=== Abbacchio alla cacciatora ===
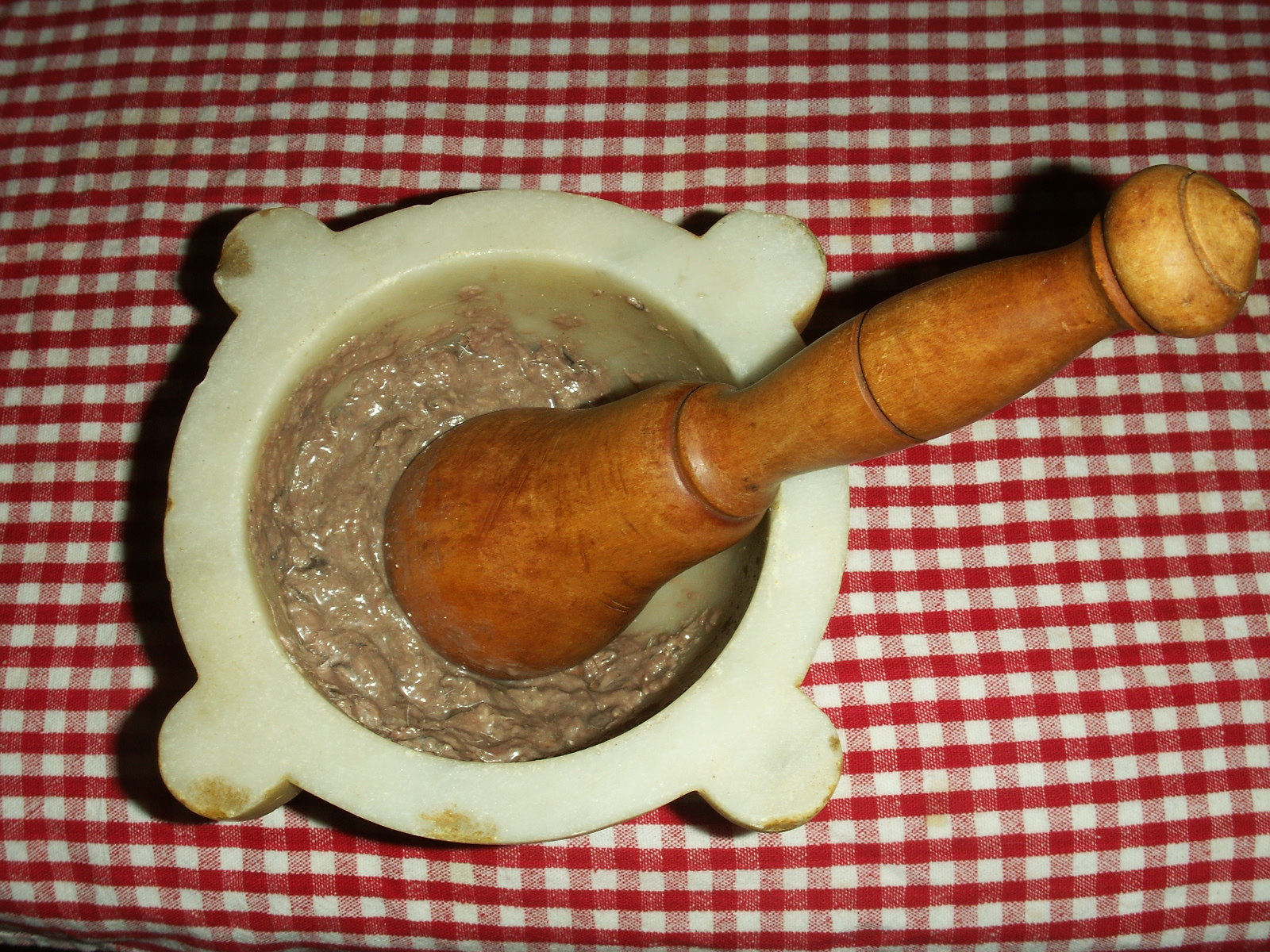
Anchovy paste, necessary for the preparation of the abbacchio alla cacciatora

Abbacchio alla cacciatora takes its name from the cacciatora preparation. Piece browned in lard and then cooked for about 45 minutes with garlic, sage and rosemary doused with salted anchovy paste crushed and cooked in the meat sauce. This recipe, typical of Roman cuisine, is prepared throughout Italy. Besides Easter, this recipe is prepared all year round, especially for Sunday lunch.

=== Abbacchio alla romana ===
Abbacchio alla romana (lit. 'Roman abbacchio') is browned whole in garlic, oil and chopped ham. Cooking is completed with rosemary, vinegar, salt and pepper. It is usually served with roasted potatoes. At the end of cooking the abbacchio in the oven, a sauce based on anchovies and aromatic herbs is added.

=== Abbacchio a scottadito ===
Ribs greased with lard, salted and peppered, and cooked over coals. The recipe, originally from the Roman cuisine, is prepared throughout Italy. The Italian term scottadito ('finger burner') is used to define the recipe because this dish must be enjoyed very hot to appreciate its softness but, consequently, at the risk of burning your fingers.

=== Abbacchio alla brace ===
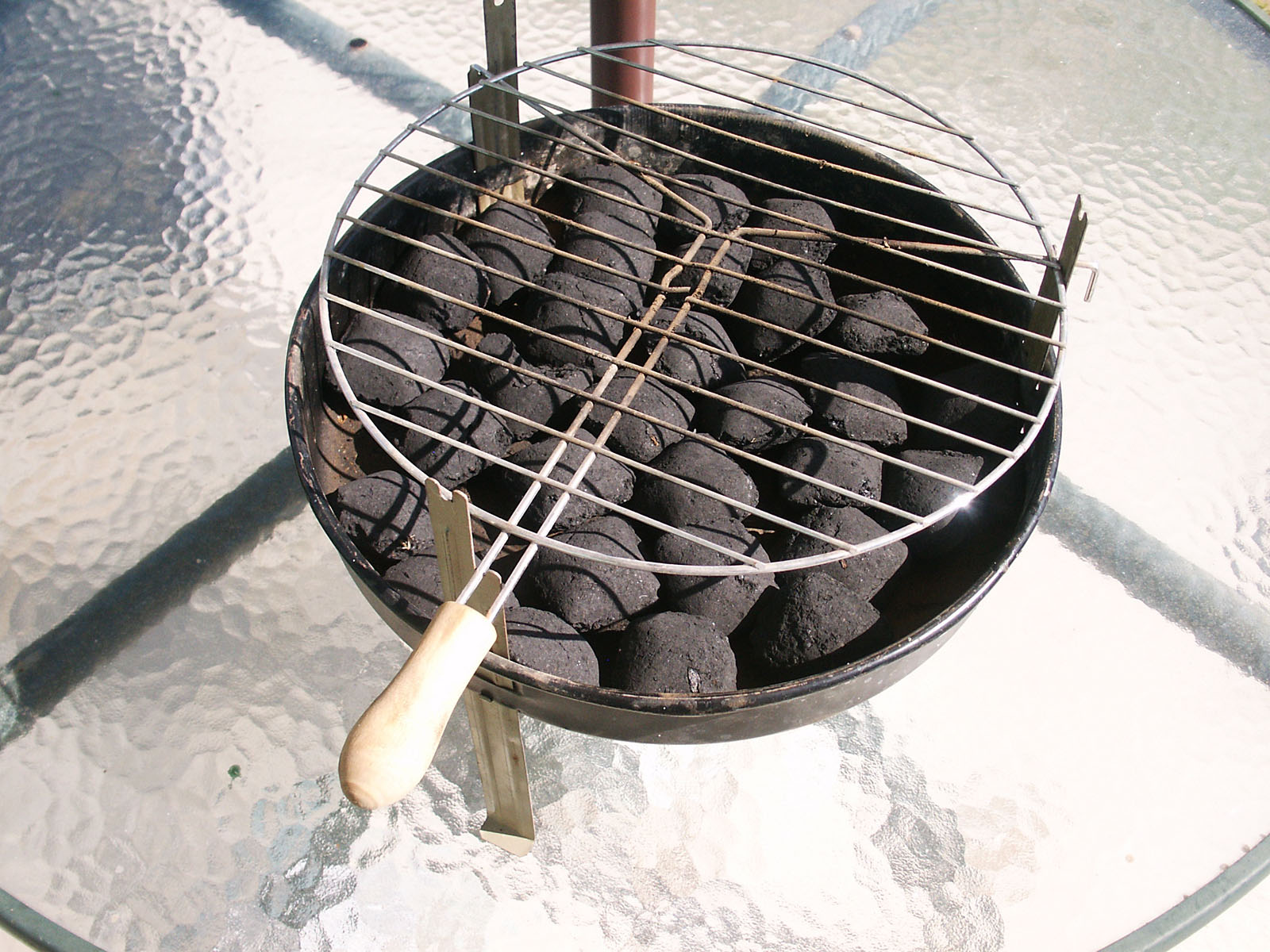
A grill

Leave the abbacchio to marinate with olive oil, salt, pepper and rosemary. The abbacchio is then cooked on the grill (in Italian brace, hence the name of this recipe).

=== Abbacchio brodettato ===
The abbacchio is browned with lard or olive oil, and with chopped ham and onion, salt and pepper. Add the white wine and when the latter has evaporated, add boiling water to form a broth (in Italian, brodo, hence the name of the recipe) until cooking is complete.

=== Abbacchio con i carciofi ===
The ingredients of this recipe are artichokes (in Italian, carciofi, hence the name of this recipe), onion, Frascati DOC wine, garlic and olive oil.

=== Abbacchio all'etrusca ===
The ingredients of the abbacchio all'etrusca are mature sheep's cheese, mint, salt and pepper.

== Traditions ==
In Italy the consumption of abbacchio is common as an Easter dish. In central Italy abbacchio is also a Christmas food. In Italy at Easter, abbacchio is cooked in different ways, with recipes that vary from region to region. In Rome it is roasted, in Apulia in the oven, in Naples it is cooked with peas and eggs, in Sardinia it is cooked in the oven with potatoes, artichokes and myrtle and in Tuscany it is cooked in cacciatora style. Other local preparations include frying and stewing.

Eating abbacchio at Easter has a symbolic meaning. The Paschal Lamb of the New Testament is in fact, for Christianity, the son of God Jesus Christ. The Paschal Lamb, in particular, represents the sacrifice of Jesus Christ for the sins of humanity. Eating lamb at Easter therefore commemorates the death and resurrection of Jesus.

== See also ==
- Roman cuisine
- List of lamb dishes
