= Oxtail stew =

Traditional food

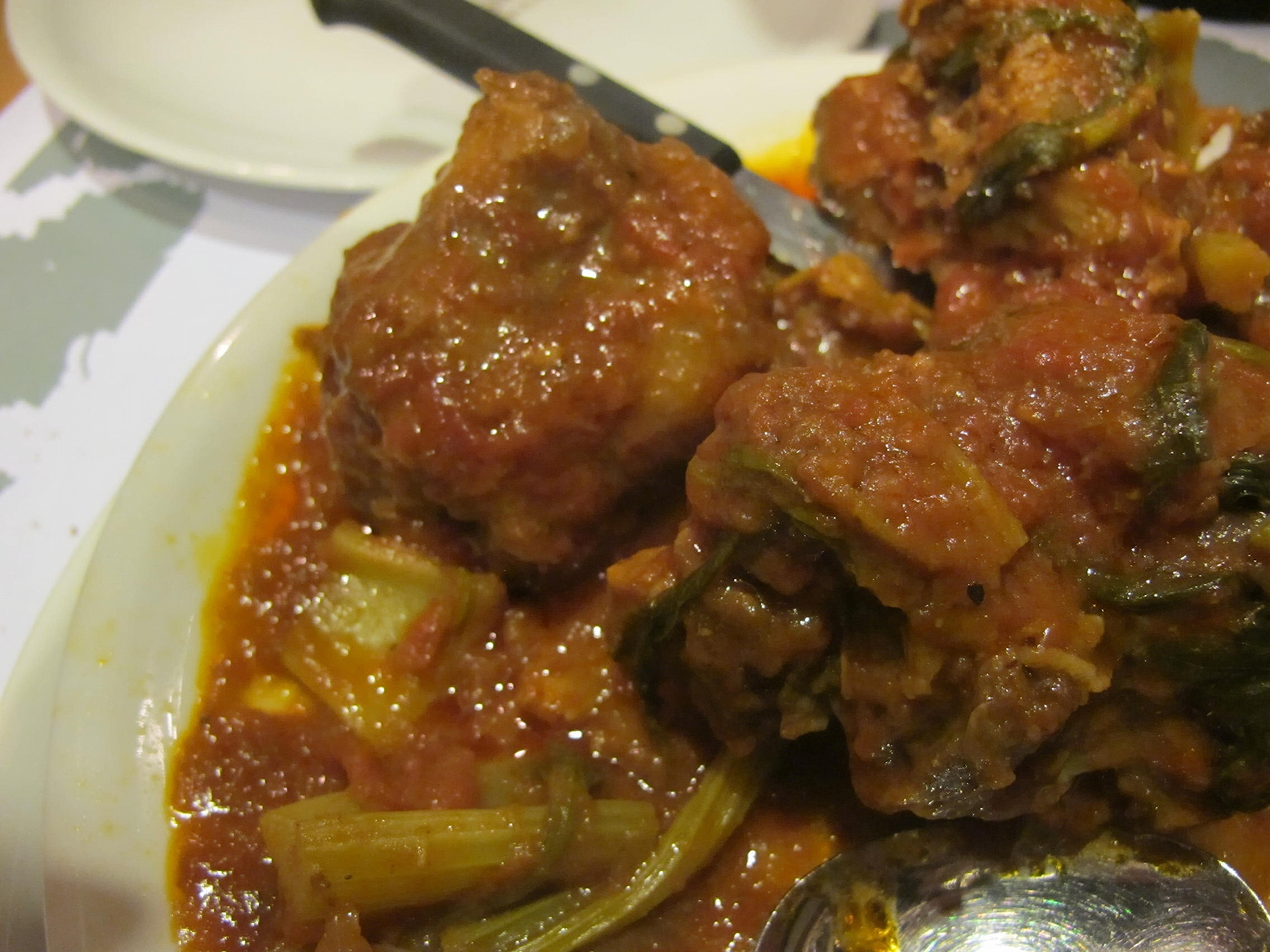
Coda alla vaccinara, an oxtail stew in Roman cuisine

Oxtail stew dishes are a traditional item in various cuisines.

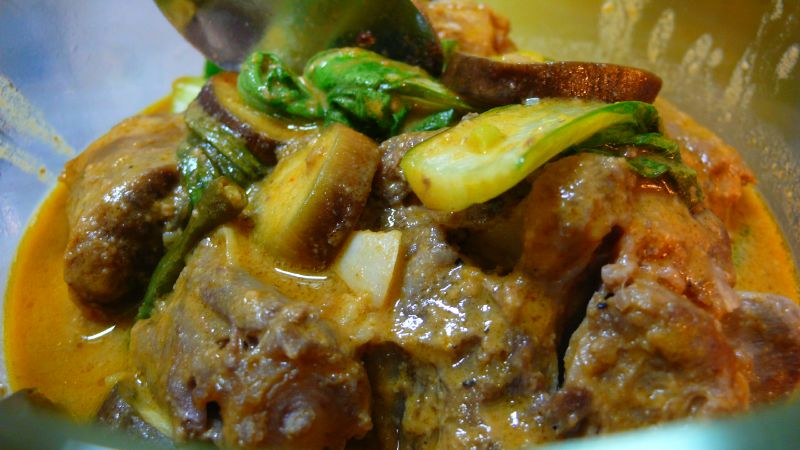
Kare-kare stew from the Philippines, made with meat, tripe, oxtail, peanut sauce, and vegetables

- Coda alla vaccinara is a modern Roman cuisine stew made with oxtail.
- There are numerous oxtail stews in French cuisine.
- Kare-kare is a meat, tripe, oxtail and vegetables in peanut sauce stew in Filipino cuisine customarily served with bagoong alamang (shrimp paste).
- Maafe is an African oxtail stew.
- Rabo de toro is a traditional Spanish oxtail stew.

Oxtail stew is a traditional Lesothian cuisine dish.

== See also ==
- List of stews
- Oxtail soup
