= Arrabbiata sauce =

Italian pasta sauce

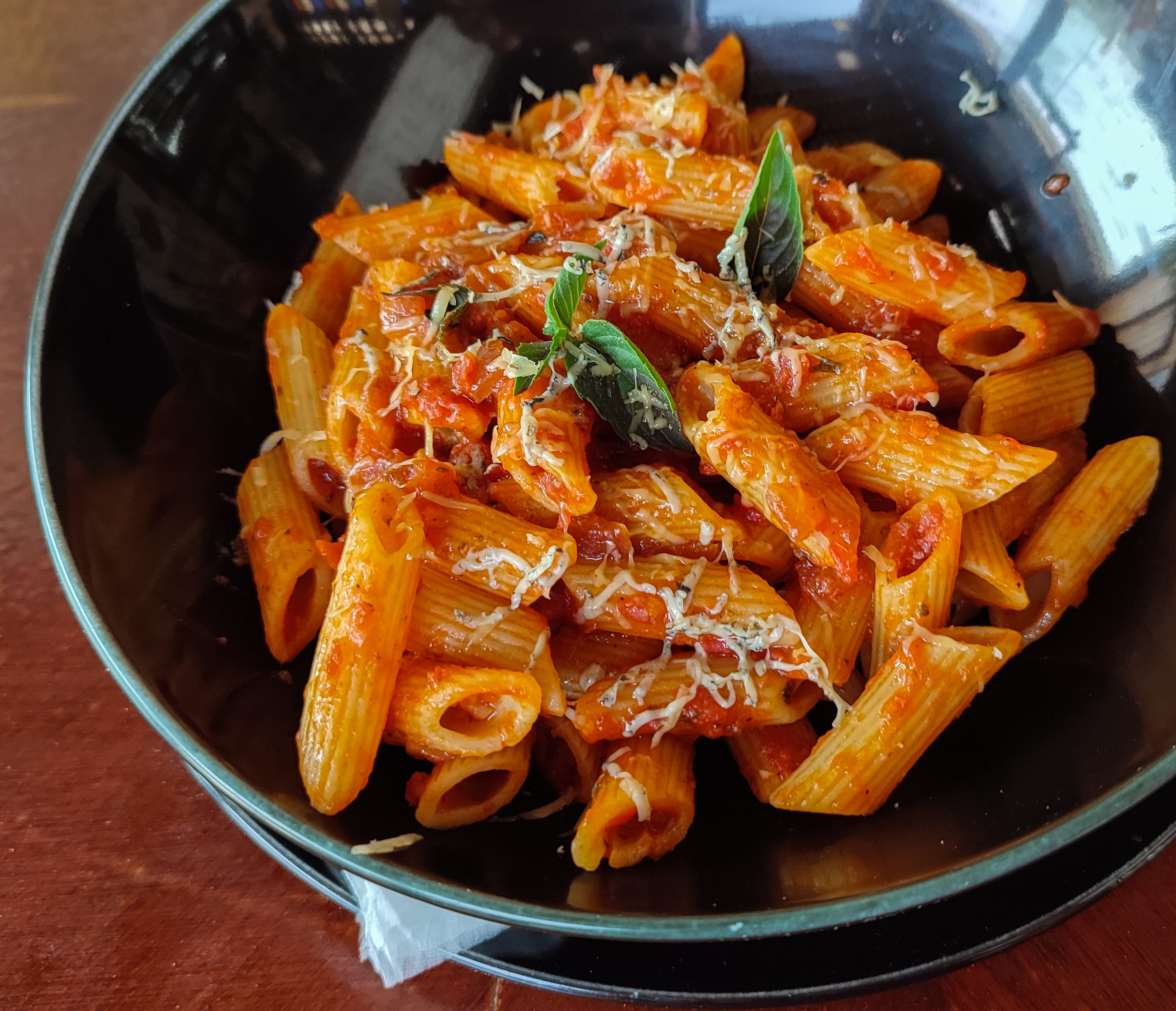
- Penne all'arrabbiata
- Alternative names: Arrabbiata (in Italian)
- Type: Sauce
- Place of origin: Italy
- Region or state: Lazio
- Main ingredients: Tomatoes, garlic, peperoncino, parsley, extra virgin olive oil
- Variations: Grated Parmesan or pecorino romano

Arrabbiata sauce, known in Italian as arrabbiata (lit. 'angry'; arabbiata in Romanesco dialect), is a spicy sauce made with tomatoes, garlic, peperoncino, parsley, and extra virgin olive oil. The sauce originates from the Lazio region of Italy, and particularly from the city of Rome.

== Origin of the name ==
Arrabbiata literally means 'angry' in Italian; in Romanesco dialect the adjective arabbiato denotes a characteristic (in this case spiciness) pushed to excess. In Rome, in fact, any food cooked in a pan with a lot of oil, garlic, and peperoncino so as to provoke a strong thirst is called "arrabbiato" (e.g. broccoli arrabbiati).

== History ==
The invention of the dish dates back to the 1950s and 1960s, at a time when spicy food was in vogue in Roman cuisine. The dish has been celebrated several times in Italian movies, notably in Marco Ferreri's La Grande Bouffe (1973) and Federico Fellini's Roma (1972).

== See also ==
Media related to Arrabbiata sauce at Wikimedia Commons

- List of sauces

== Bibliography ==
- Zanini De Vita, Oretta; Fant, Maureen B. (2013). Sauces & Shapes: Pasta the Italian Way. New York: W. W. Norton & Company. ISBN 978-0-393-08243-2.
- Carnacina, Luigi; Buonassisi, Vincenzo (1975). Roma in Cucina (in Italian). Milano: Giunti Martello.
- Ravaro, Fernando (2005). Dizionario romanesco (in Italian). Roma: Newton Compton. ISBN 9788854117921.
