= Bucatini =

Type of pasta

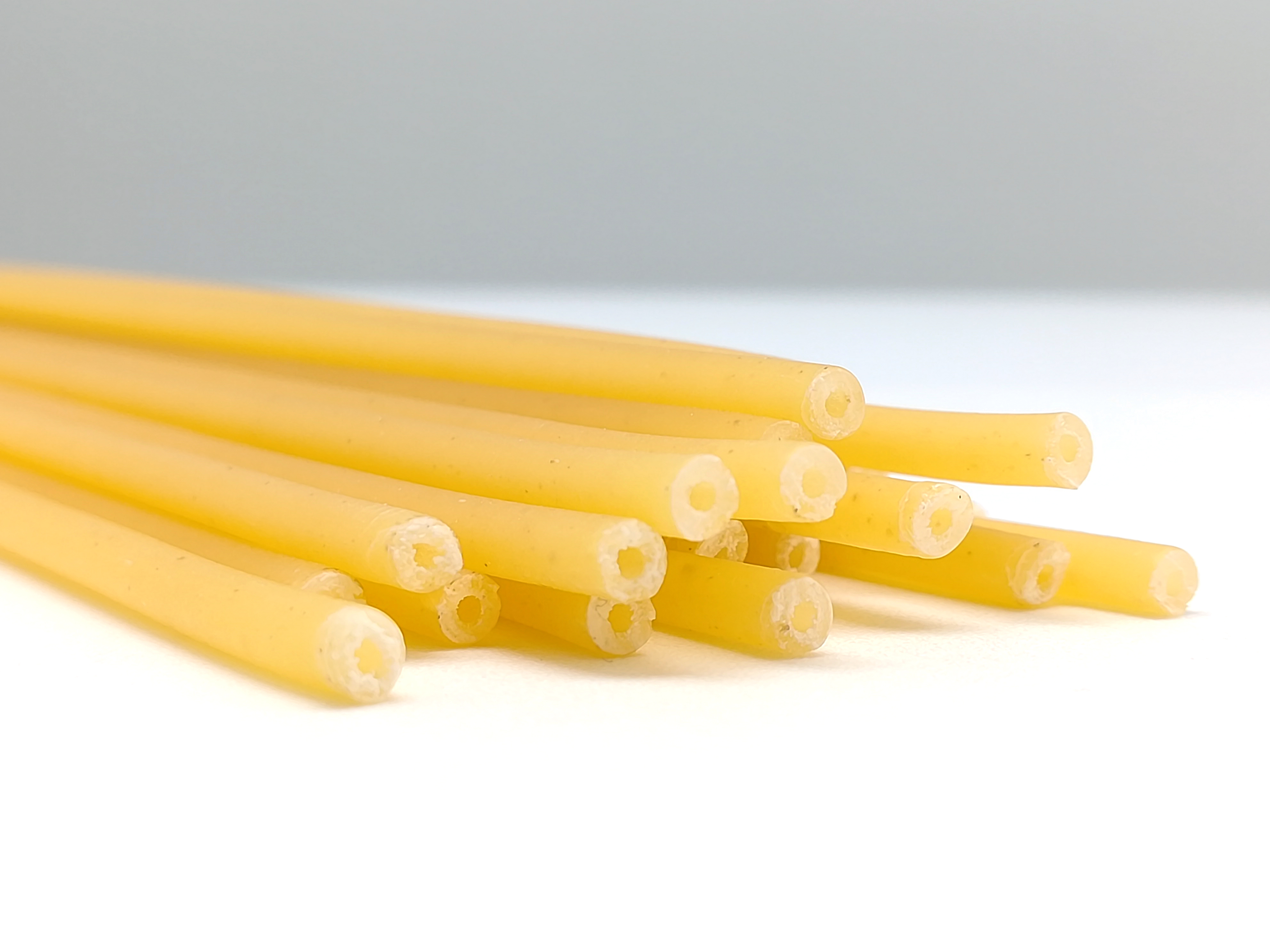
- Alternative names: Perciatelli
- Type: Pasta
- Place of origin: Italy
- Main ingredients: Durum wheat flour, water
- Variations: Ziti, zitoni

Bucatini (Italian: [bukaˈtiːni]), also known as perciatelli (Italian: [pertʃaˈtɛlli]), is a thick spaghetti-like pasta with a hole running through the center. It is common throughout Lazio, particularly Rome.

The similar pasta type ziti (Italian: [ˈdziːti]) consists of long hollow rods which are also smooth in texture and have square-cut edges; "cut ziti" are ziti cut into shorter tubes. There is also a wider version of ziti, zitoni (Italian: [dziˈtoːni]).

== Name ==
The name comes from the Italian buco, meaning 'hole', while bucato or its Neapolitan-language variant perciato means 'pierced'.

Bucatini is the name around Rome; around Naples it is perciatelli.

== Composition and use ==
Bucatini is a tubed pasta made of hard durum wheat flour and water. Its length is 25–30 cm (10–12 in) with a 3 mm (1/8 in) diameter. The average cooking time is nine minutes.

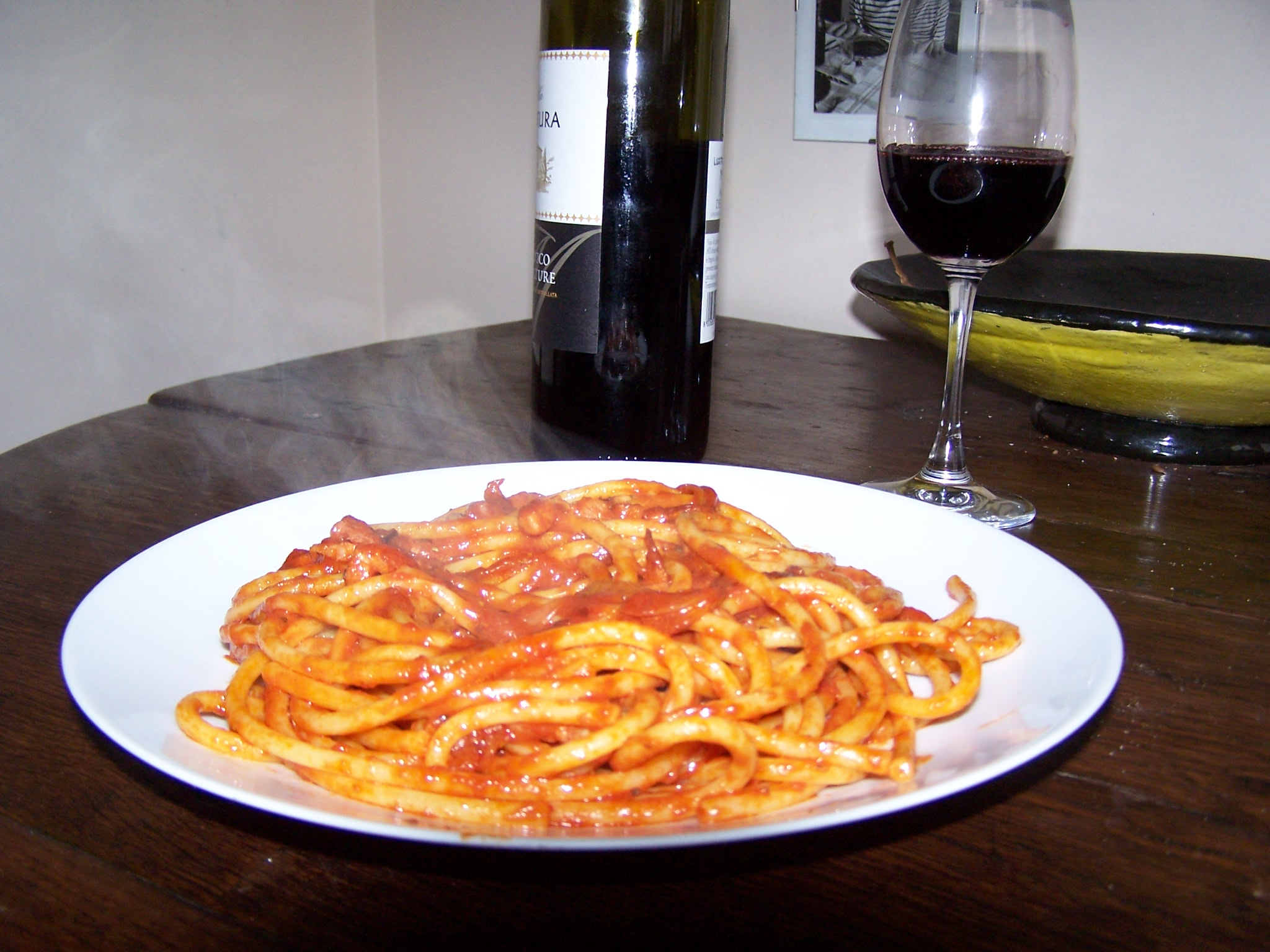
Bucatini all'amatriciana, a dish prepared with bucatini pasta

In Italian cuisine, bucatini is served with buttery sauces, guanciale, vegetables, cheese, eggs, and anchovies or sardines. One of the most common sauces to serve with bucatini is the amatriciana sauce, bucatini all'amatriciana. It is traditionally made with guanciale, a type of cured meat taken from the pork jowl. If guanciale is unavailable, bucatini gricia can be replaced with prosciutto and added red pepper flakes.

Bucatini gricia is form of pasta alla gricia, a pasta dish made with guanciale and pecorino cheese. Guanciale is a type of salumi, specifically pork cheeks that have been cured for a month in a basin full of salt, black pepper, and chili powder, and then hung up to age for another month. Florence Fabricant advised against using bacon (too smoky) or pancetta (too lean).

== Preparation ==
Standard pasta machines will roll out sheets of flat pasta which are then cut into ribbons to make flat, ribbon-style pasta like fettuccine, tagliatelle, or pappardelle. Bucatini, on the other hand, has to be extruded rather than rolled.

The pasta dough is fed into a machine that forces it through a perforated disk, very similar to a meat grinder. The shape of the pasta depends on the shape of the perforations. Bucatini are made with a disk with tiny circular perforations, which forces the pasta dough to emerge in long tubes. The tubes are then trimmed off to the desired length and then either cooked fresh or dried.

Bucatini can be made at home with a stand mixer and a pasta extruder. Since it has a hole in the middle, raw homemade bucatini must be handled gently so as not to squeeze the hole shut prior to cooking.

== See also ==
Media related to Bucatini at Wikimedia Commons

- List of pasta
- Baked ziti

== Sources ==
- n.a. (2024). The Encyclopedia of Pasta: over 350 recipes for the ultimate comfort food. Encyclopedia Cookbooks. Nashville, Tennessee: Cider Mill Press. ISBN 978-1-4003-4610-3.
- Bugialli, Giuliano (2000). Bugialli on Pasta (Rev. ed.). New York: Simon & Schuster. ISBN 978-0-671-62024-0. LCCN 99059490. OCLC 42892274.
