= Peperoncino =

Italian name for hot chili pepper

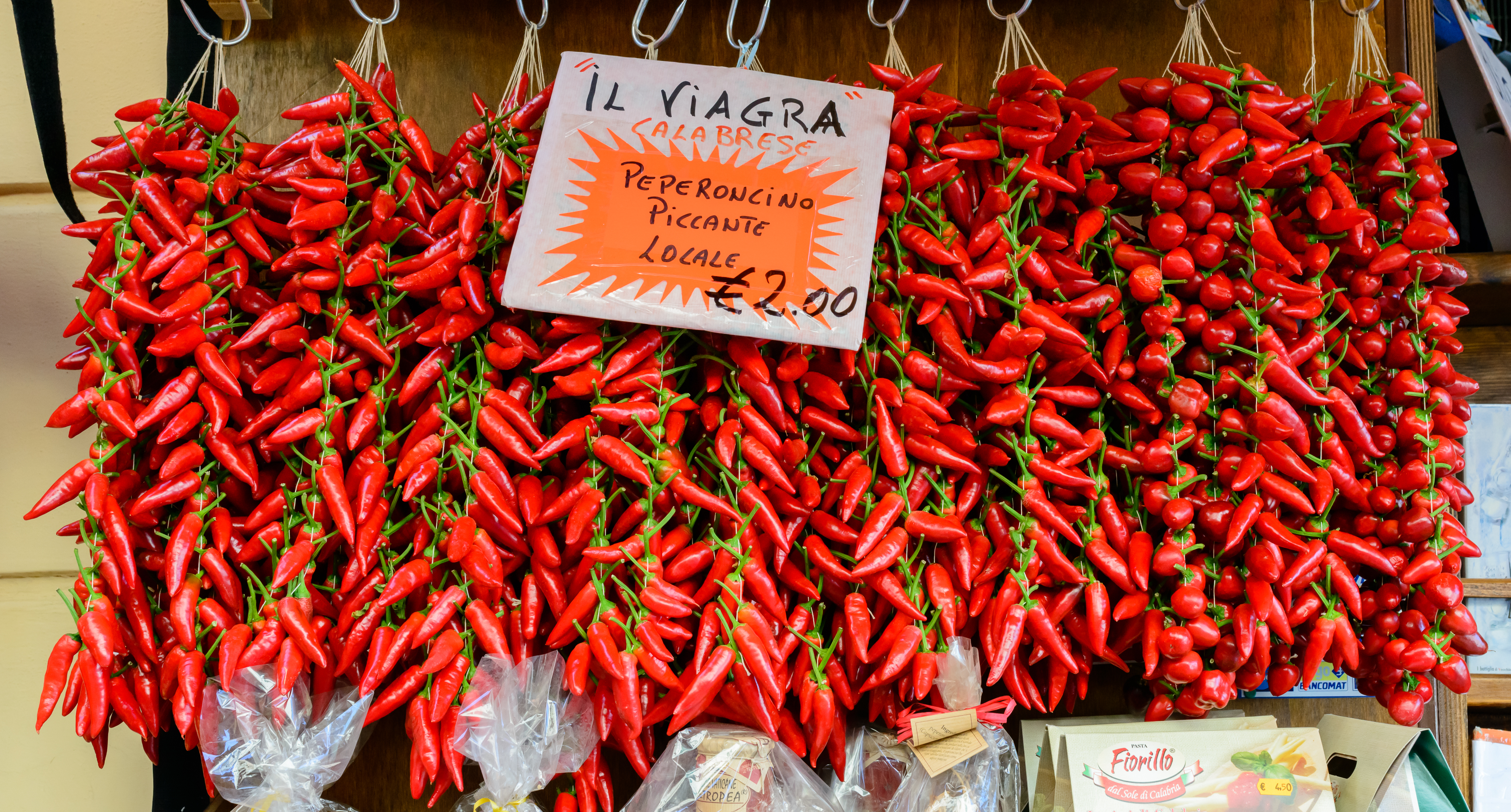
- Peperoncini for sale at a market of Tropea in Calabria, Italy

- Heat: Hot
- Scoville scale: 15,000–30,000 SHU

Peperoncino (Italian: [peperonˈtʃiːno]; pl.: peperoncini) is the generic Italian name for a hot chili pepper, specifically some regional cultivars of the species Capsicum annuum and C. frutescens (chili pepper and Tabasco pepper, respectively). (The diminutive suffix ino means smaller; the larger sweet bell pepper is called peperone (pl.: peperoni) in Italian.) Like most chili peppers, the fruit is green or yellowish-green when young, and ripens to a red colour.

== History ==
The peperoncino probably came to Italy around the 15th century, when southern Italy was under Spanish dominion. It was an export from the new world among other plants new to Europe, such as the tomato. Like the tomato, the peperoncino was first considered a decorative and possibly poisonous plant before it was adopted into Italian cuisine. It might have become popular as a food long before the cookbooks attest to its use; these cookbooks were written for the upper classes, while the peperoncino was a cheap and convenient food for the lower classes.

Pietro Andrea Mattioli first described peperoncini in 1568 and mentioned how much hotter they were than other varieties of pepper from Asia. The earliest surviving published use of peperoncino in a recipe dates to a 1694 cookbook by the Italian chef Antonio Latini. In his recipe for salsa alla spagnola, chopped peperoncini, tomatoes, and some onion are combined with peppermint, salt, and oil, to be served as a relish.

== Culinary use ==
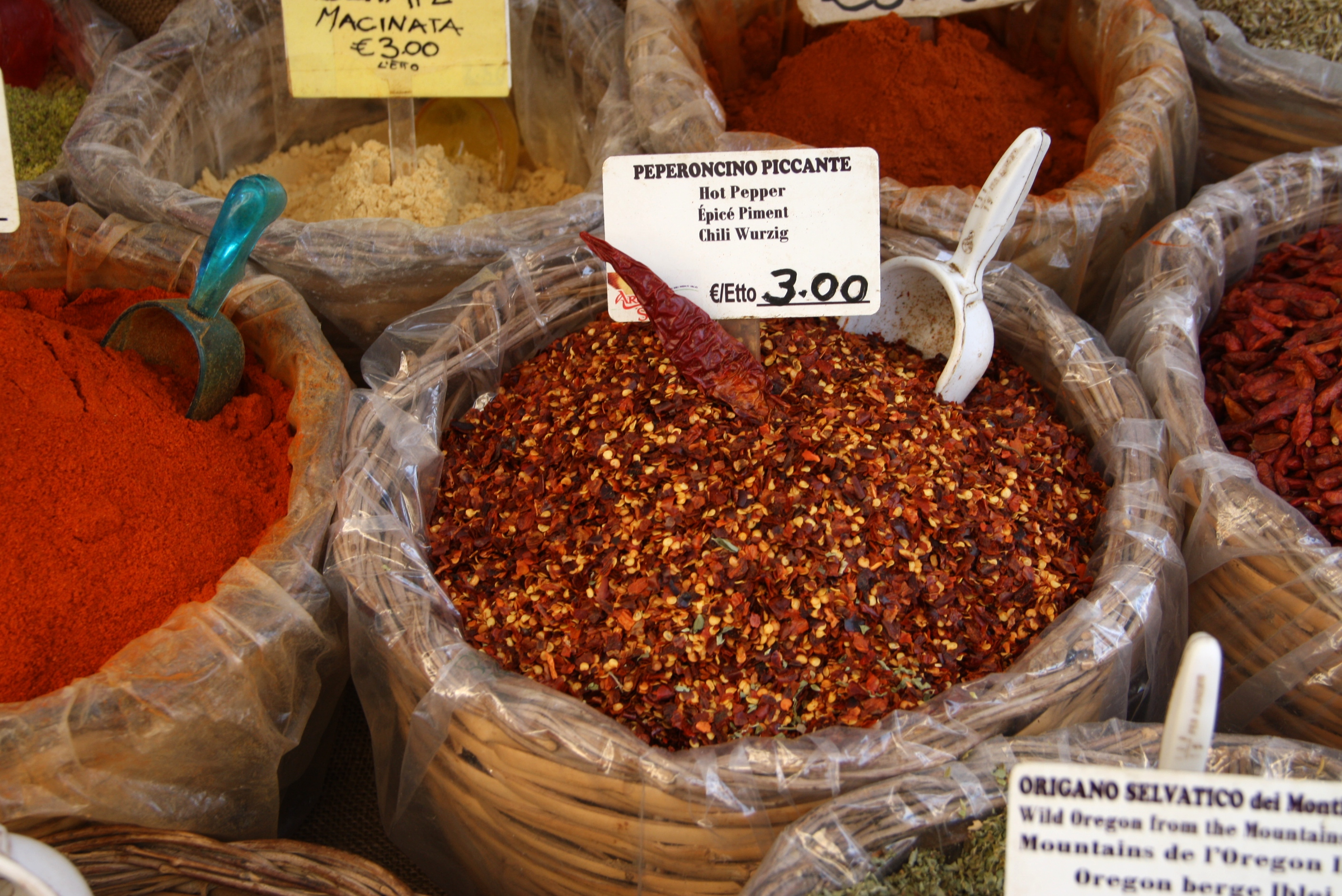
Crushed peperoncini sold at a market in Syracuse, Sicily

In Italian cuisine peperoncini are used with moderation and the flavour is considered more important than the heat. As a consequence the Scoville rating serves only as a rough guide to the heat, which is quite varied among the different cultivars. A typical peperoncino from Calabria rates 15,000 to 30,000 on the Scoville scale.

The peperoncino is especially important in Calabrian cuisine. In late summer, peperoncini are stitched on wires and hung from buildings. They are left to dry in spots with sunlight and ventilation to conserve them, allowing their use in cooking until the next harvest. They are eaten whole, fried until crisp, crushed, pickled, powdered or as a paste. Notable Calabrian dishes which use peperoncini are the condiments bomba calabrese, chili oil and the spreadable pork sausage 'nduja. It is also used in dishes of other regional cuisines of southern and central Italy, such as the Roman-style arrabbiata sauce and the Apulian orecchiette alle cime di rapa (orecchiette pasta with broccoli rabe).

While most crushed red pepper (a common component of spicy Italian-style cuisine and frequently sprinkled on pizza and other dishes) in North America is today made from cayenne or jalapeño peppers common in that region, some specialty markets there supply imported Italian red peperoncino flakes.

== Culture ==
Since 1992 the annual Peperoncino Festival has been held in the town of Diamante, Calabria. Organised by the Accademia Italiana del Peperoncino, the festival now attracts tens of thousands of visitors. It is held for four days surrounding the first weekend of September on the town's seaside promenade. The festival has a large market where local food products made with peperoncini are sold, and hosts a peperoncino-eating contest. Calabrian chili oil is a popular international export.

== Bibliography ==
- Matticchio Bastianich, Lidia; Bastianich Manuali, Tanya (2009). Lidia Cooks from the Heart of Italy: A Feast of 175 Regional Recipes. New York City: Alfred A. Knopf. ISBN 9780307273413.
- Bressanini, Dario (2005). "Tutti i gradi del peperoncino" (in Italian). Università dell'Insubria.
- DeWitt, David (2014). Precious Cargo: How Foods from the Americas Changed the World. Berkeley: Counterpoint. ISBN 9781619023888.
- Farnetti, Walter (27 February 2015). "La classifica dei peperoncini più piccanti del mondo". Agrodolce (in Italian).
- Iannotti, Marie (2011). The Beginner's Guide to Growing Heirloom Vegetables: The 100 Easiest-to-Grow, Tastiest-to-Eat Vegetables for Your Garden. Portland, Oregon: Timber Press. ISBN 9781604693843.
- Orsini, Joseph (2015). Italian Family Cooking: Unlocking a Treasury of Recipes and Stories. Macmillan. ISBN 9781466892002.
- Riley, Gillian (2007). The Oxford Companion to Italian Food. New York City: Oxford University Press. ISBN 9780198606178.
- Sinclair, Charles Gordon, ed. (1998). International Dictionary of Food and Cooking. Chicago: Fitzroy Dearborn Publishers. ISBN 9781579580575.
