= Spaghetti alla chitarra =

Type of pasta

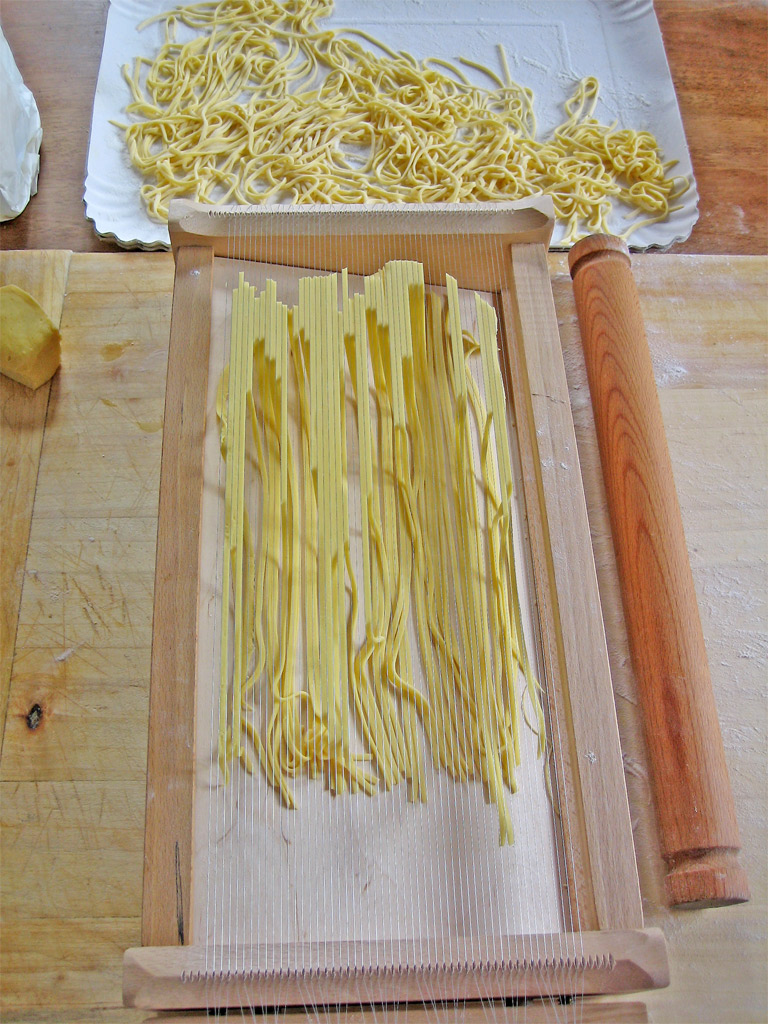
- Traditional preparation using a chitarra
- Alternative names: Maccheroni alla chitarra
- Type: Pasta
- Place of origin: Italy
- Region or state: Abruzzo
- Main ingredients: Durum, egg, salt
- Variations: Tonnarelli

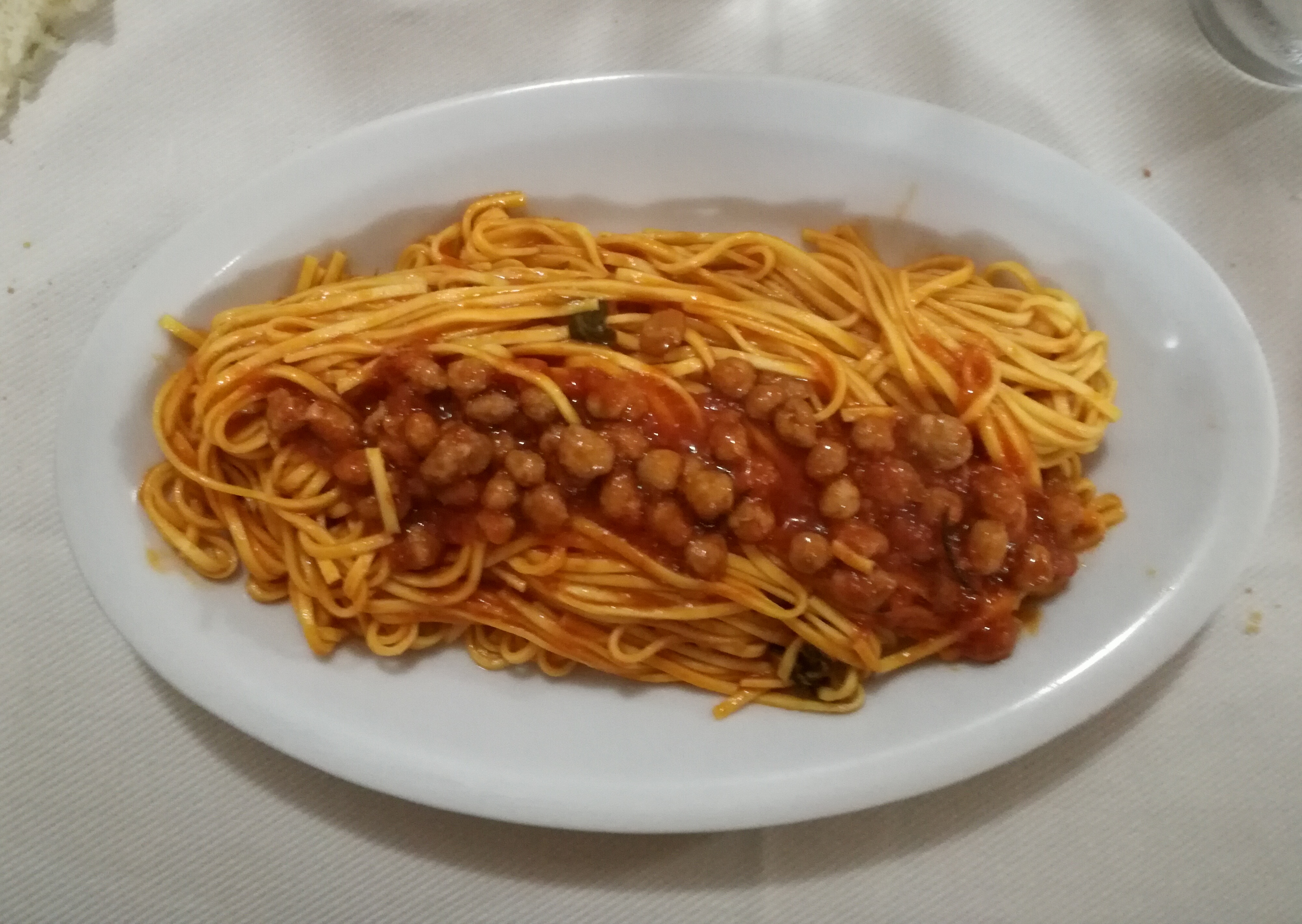
Spaghetti alla chitarra con pallottine (Teramo-style chitarra with meatballs)

Spaghetti alla chitarra (Italian: [spaˈɡetti ˌalla kiˈtarra]), also known as maccheroni alla chitarra, is a variety of egg pasta typical of the Abruzzo region of Italy, with a square cross section about 2–3 mm thick. Tonnarelli are a similar pasta from Lazio, used especially in the Roman cacio e pepe. Ciriole, traditionally from Molise, is the thicker version of chitarra, approximately twice the thickness of spaghetti. Because the pasta are cut from a sheet rather than extruded through a die, spaghetti alla chitarra are square rather than round in cross-section.

Spaghetti alla chitarra is listed as a prodotto agroalimentare tradizionale (PAT) by the Italian Ministry of Agricultural, Food and Forestry Policies.

== Origin of the name ==
The name of this spaghetti comes from the tool (the so-called chitarra, lit. 'guitar') this pasta is produced with. This tool gives the spaghetti its name, shape, and a porous texture that allows pasta sauce to adhere well to the pasta itself. The chitarra is a frame with a series of parallel wires crossing it.

== History and production ==
The origin of the chitarra is still not very clear, though a traditional recipe from the province of Teramo originated in the early 1800s or even before. It is also claimed that the chitarra originated from the province of Chieti. Before then, pasta was cut with a special rolling pin with notches to obtain its particular shape. Although its origins are from Abruzzo, it can be found across southern Italy. It gets the name of tonnarelli in Lazio, torchioli, troccoli, or truoccoli in Basilicata and Apulia, or cirioli molisani in Molise.

The dough consists of durum wheat semolina and eggs, with no added salt. It is worked and, after a rest of about 30 minutes covered, rolled flat with a rolling pin. The dough is then placed on the chitarra and pushed through with the rolling pin, so that the strings of the "guitar" cut it into strips. Pasta makers from Abruzzo bring down the cut dough by passing their fingers over it, as they would "play a guitar".

In Abruzzo, maccheroni alla chitarra are most typically prepared with a ragù of pork, beef, and lamb. In particular areas of the Abruzzi (for example Teramo) the traditional condiment is tomato sauce with beef meatballs, so-called pallottine. In Abruzzo, chitarra alla teramana, which is a traditional Abruzzo recipe, is a long, thin, squared spaghetti pasta served with tiny meatballs (polpettine). It is generally a first-course meal (primo piatto).

A dried variation, without egg, is often marketed as spaghetti or maccheroni alla chitarra both within Italy and abroad.

== See also ==
- List of pasta
