= Quinto quarto =

Offal of butchered animals in the cuisine of Rome

In the cuisine of modern Rome quinto quarto (lit. 'fifth quarter') is the offal of butchered animals. The name makes sense on more than one level: because offal amounts to about a fourth of the weight of the carcass; because the importance of offal in Roman cooking is at least as great as any of the outer quarters, fore and hind; and because in the past slaughterhouse workers were partly paid in kind with a share of the offal.

Until modern time the division of the cattle in Rome was made following this simple scheme: the first quarto was destined to be sold to the nobles, the second one was for the clergy, the third one for the bourgeoisie and finally the fourth quarto was for the soldiers. The proletariat could afford only the entrails.

Offal cuisine is particularly rich in Rome in spring, when not only beef and pork but also suckling lamb and kid offal appears on trattorie menus. Typical dishes include:

- pajata (suckling kid, lamb or veal intestines)
- coratella (heart, lung and oesophagus of lamb or kid, sautéed with artichoke)
- testarelle (whole roasted lamb's or kid's head)

== See also ==
- Italian cuisine
- List of Italian foods and drinks
