= Pagliata =

Italian dish from Rome

Pagliata (or, in Romanesco dialect, pajata) is a traditional Roman dish primarily using the intestine of a young calf (tripe) that has only eaten milk. Since the contents of the intestine are left inside, the resulting dish is comparable to cheese in a sausage casing. The intestines are usually plaited before serving.

== Characteristic ==
It is of traditional use in Roman cuisine. Pajata is the term for the small intestine and its contents of an unweaned calf, i.e., fed only on its mother's milk. The intestines are cleaned and skinned, but the chyme is left inside. The intestine is cut into pieces 20–25 cm long, which are bound together with white thread, forming rings. When cooked, the combination of heat and the enzyme rennet in the intestines coagulates the chyme and creates a sort of thick, creamy, cheese-like sauce. These rings can be served simply seasoned and grilled (pajata arrosto) or in the traditional Roman dish in which pajata is stewed in a typical tomato sauce and served with rigatoni.

Pagliata is also consumed in Umbria, especially in the area of Terni, Spoleto, Foligno and the Valnerina, and in the Marche, in particular in the area of Ancona, Camerino, Fabriano and Macerata, where it is cooked on the grill and is traditionally known by the name spuntature.

== Preparation ==
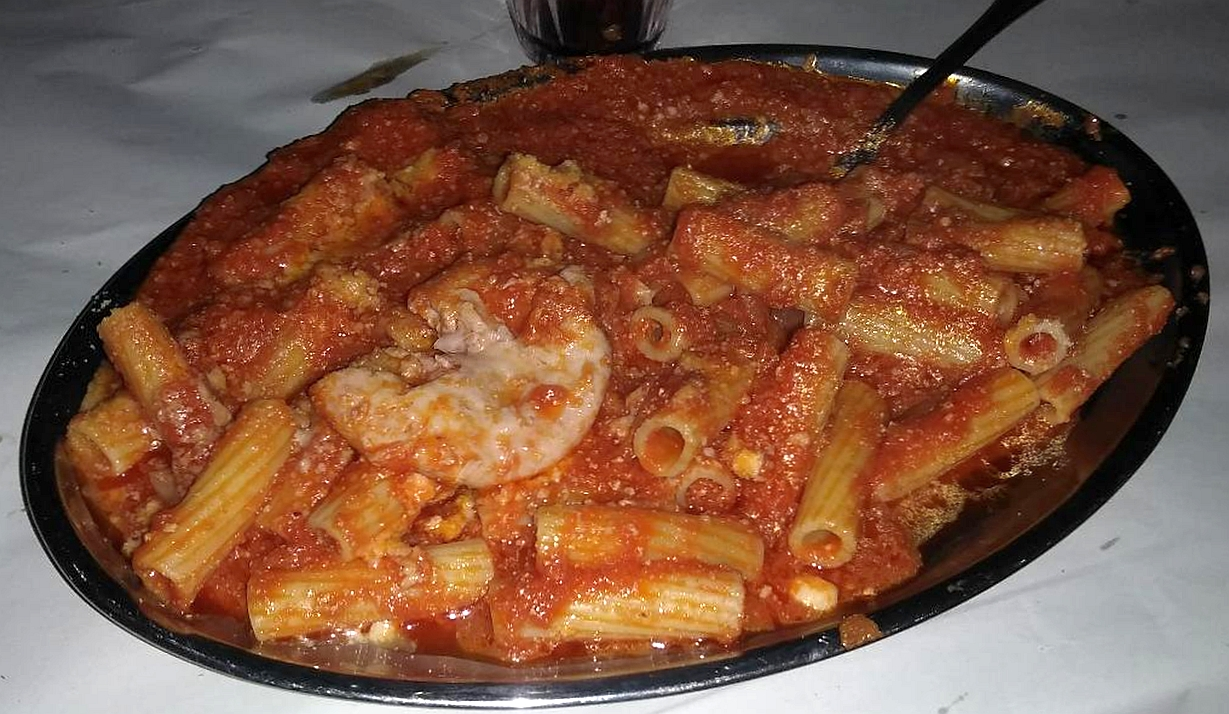
Rigatoni con la pajata (typical Roman recipe)

The classic preparation includes pagliata accompanied by rigatoni in rigatoni con la pajata (Romanesco dialect. Standard Italian: rigatoni con la pagliata, pronounced [riɡaˈtoːni kon la paʎˈʎaːta]).

== See also ==
- List of pasta dishes

== Bibliography ==
- Boni, Ada (1983) [1930]. La Cucina Romana (in Italian). Roma: Newton Compton Editori.
