= Rigatoni =

Type of pasta

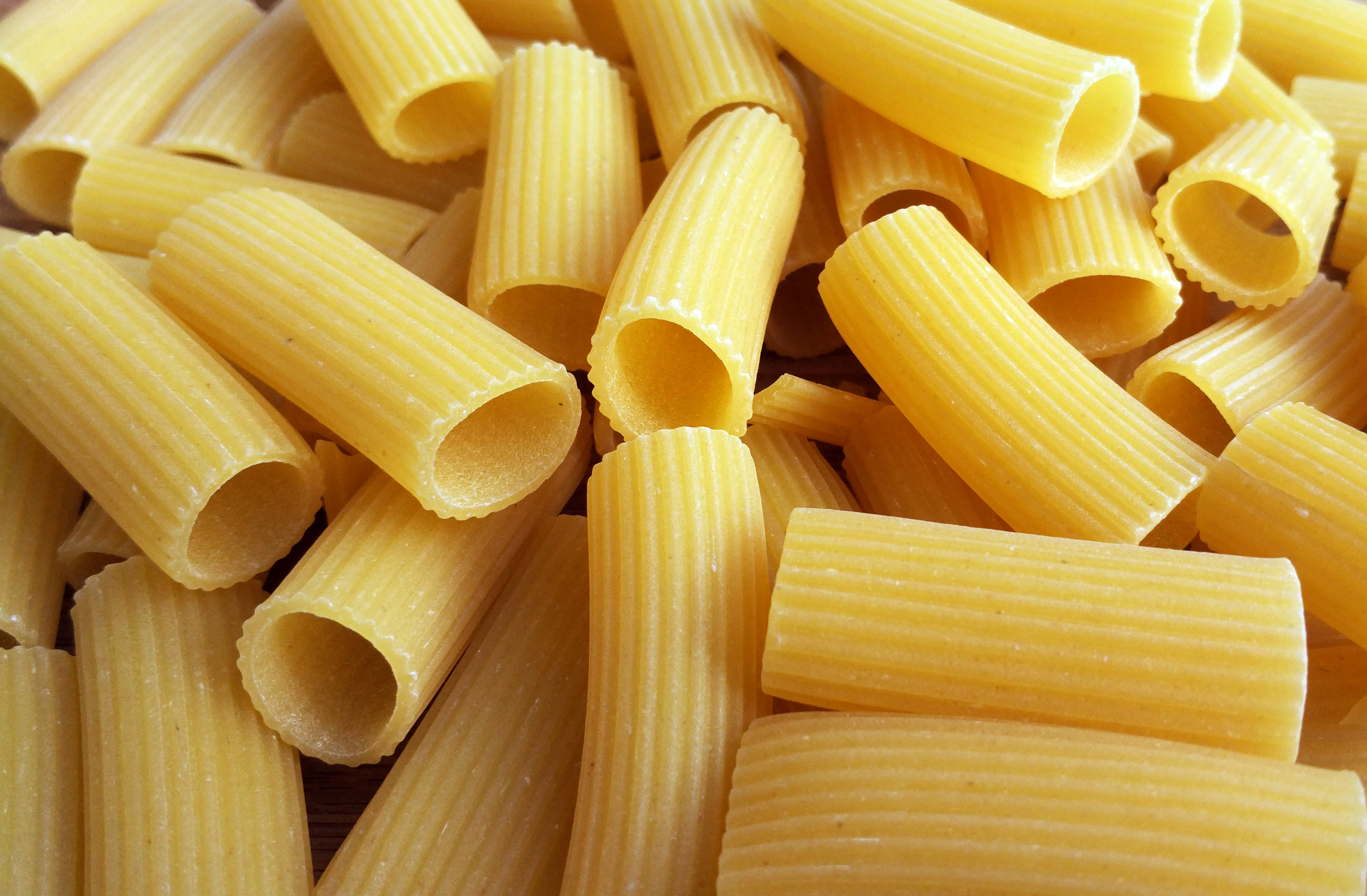
- Uncooked rigatoni
- Type: Pasta
- Place of origin: Italy
- Region or state: Southern Italy; Central Italy
- Main ingredients: Durum

Rigatoni (/rɪɡəˈtoʊni/, Italian: [riɡaˈtoːni]) is a type of pasta. They are larger than penne and ziti, and sometimes slightly curved, but not as curved as elbow macaroni. Rigatoni are characterized by ridges along their length, sometimes spiraling around the tube; unlike penne, the ends of rigatoni are cut perpendicular to the tube walls instead of diagonally.

The word rigatoni comes from the Italian word rigato (that stands for 'lined', 'striped', 'ruled', rigatone being the augmentative, and rigatoni the plural form), which means 'ridged' or 'lined', and is associated with the cuisine of southern and central Italy. Rigatoncini are a smaller version, close to the size of penne. Their name takes on the diminutive suffix -ino (pluralized -ini), denoting their relative size.

Rigatoni is a particularly favoured pasta shape in the south of Italy, especially in Sicily. Its eponymous ridges make better adhesive surfaces for sauces and grated cheese than smooth-sided pasta like ziti.

== See also ==
Media related to Rigatoni at Wikimedia Commons

- List of pasta
- Rigatoni con la pajata
