= Pasta alla gricia =

Italian pasta dish

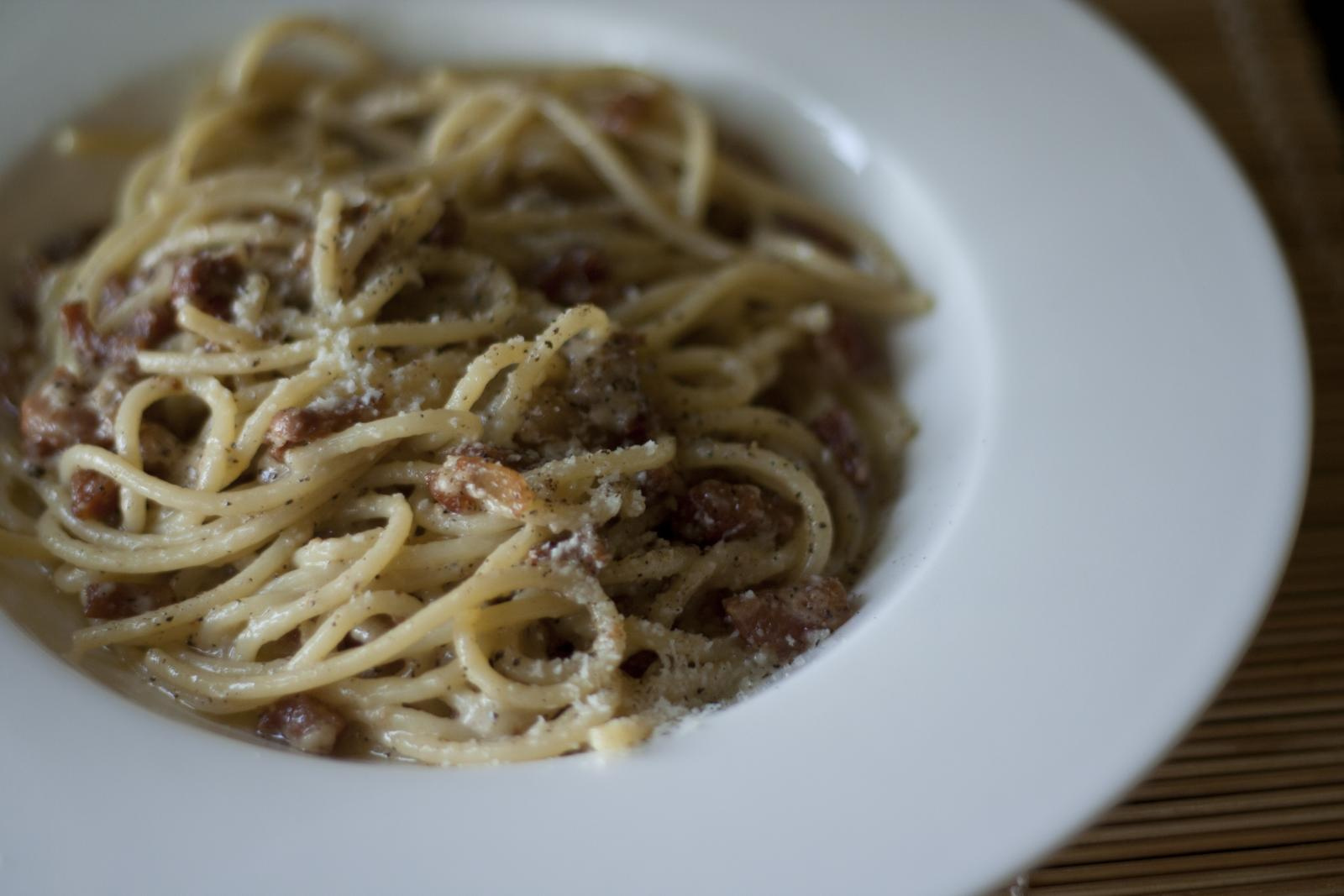
- Course: Primo (Italian course)
- Place of origin: Italy
- Region or state: Lazio
- Main ingredients: Guanciale, pecorino romano, black pepper

Pasta alla gricia is a pasta dish originating in the Lazio region of Italy, made with guanciale, pecorino romano, and black pepper.

== Origin and etymology ==
According to one hypothesis, the name of the dish is derived from the Romanesco word gricio; in papal Rome, the grici were sellers of common foods. They got this name because many of them came from Valtellina, at that time a possession of the Swiss canton of Grigioni.

Others theorize that the dish was invented in Grisciano, Lazio, near Amatrice, the origin of amatriciana. Buccini (2007) argues that this theory is more probably correct, citing the name spaghetti alla marchigiana from the 1920s, referring to the neighboring region of Marche. If this theory is correct, the name started as alla grisciana, then modified to alla gricia to fit the occupational theme of puttanesca, scarpariello, carbonara, and carrettiera. In Amatrice as late as the 1960s amatriciana was prepared without tomato, coinciding with gricia. Gricia is also named amatriciana bianca.

== See also ==
Media related to Pasta alla gricia at Wikimedia Commons Pasta alla Gricia (Pasta with Guanciale) at the Wikibooks Cookbook subproject

- List of pasta
- List of pasta dishes

== Bibliography ==
- Zanini De Vita, Oretta; Fant, Maureen B. (2013). Sauces & Shapes: Pasta the Italian Way. New York: W. W. Norton & Company. ISBN 978-0-393-08243-2.
- Gosetti Della Salda, Anna (1967). Le ricette regionali italiane (in Italian). Milano: Solares.
- Ravaro, Fernando (2005). Dizionario romanesco (in Italian). Roma: Newton Compton. ISBN 9788854117921.
