= Penne alla vodka =

Pasta dish with vodka, cream, and tomato sauce

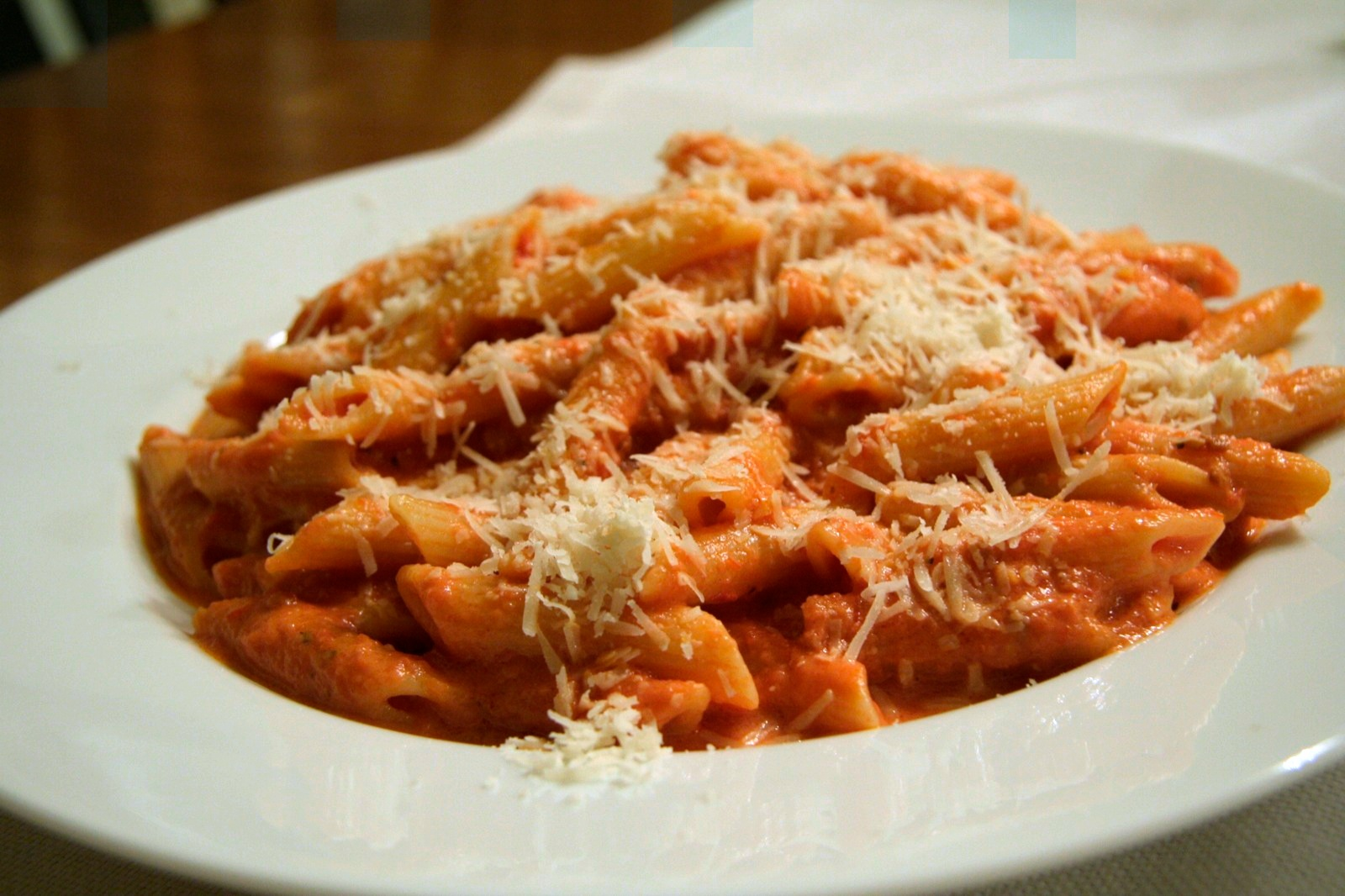
- Penne alla vodka with grated cheese
- Alternative names: Penne vodka, pasta with vodka sauce, Moscow penne
- Course: Primo (Italy); Main (United States)
- Place of origin: Italy; United States
- Created by: Debated
- Invented: 1970s
- Cooking time: 8 minutes to 10 minutes
- Main ingredients: Penne, cream, tomatoes, vodka, hot pepper flakes, pancetta

Penne alla vodka (Italian: [ˈpenne alla ˈvɔdka]) is a pasta dish of penne in a tomato and cream sauce with vodka, and usually hot pepper flakes, garlic, and pancetta. The vodka emulsifies the sauce and enhances flavor. It is usually topped with grated Parmesan or Pecorino romano cheese and black pepper.

The dish became popular in Italy and in the United States around the 1980s, as a late-night dish following evenings at the disco. It remains popular in Italian-American cuisine.

== Origins ==
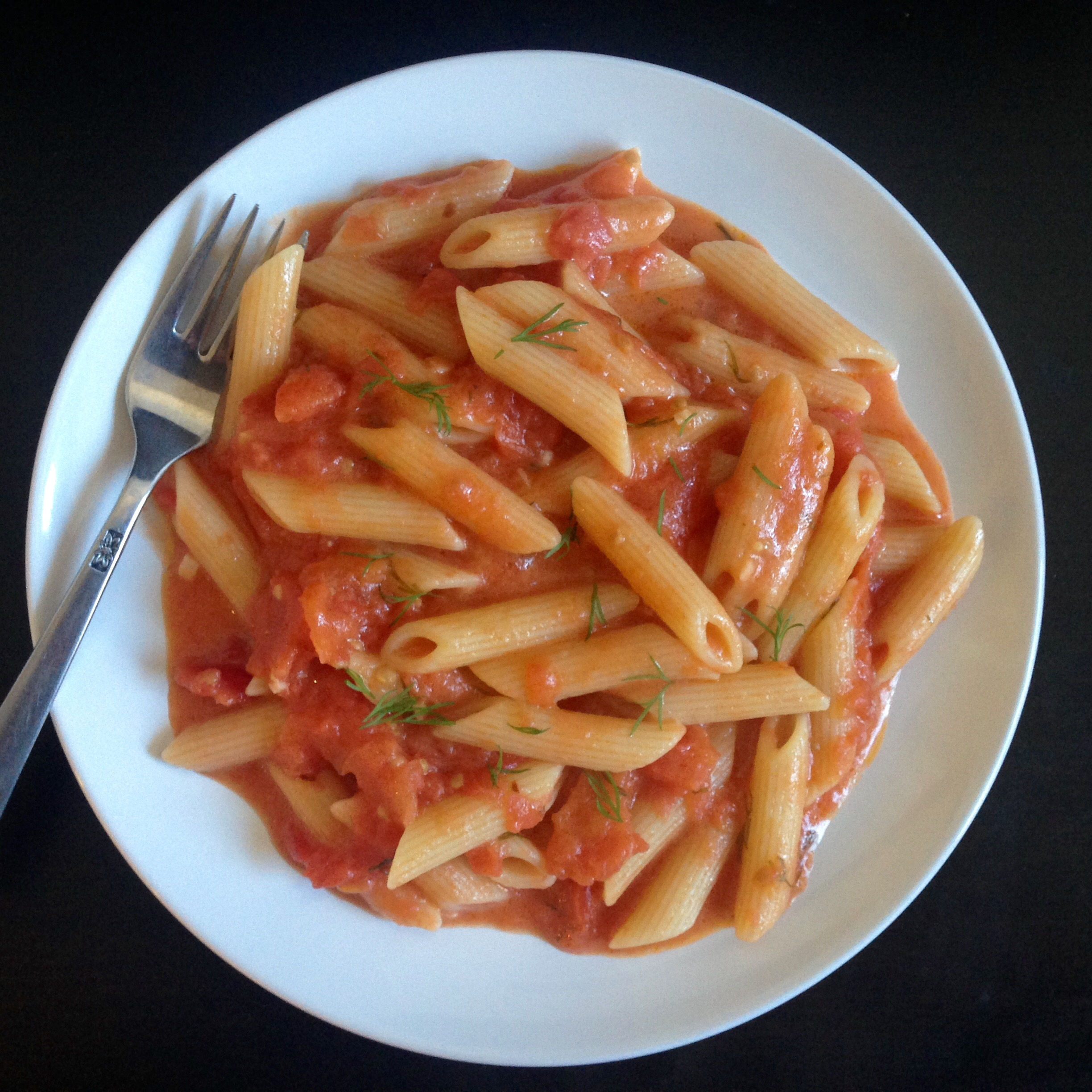
Penne alla vodka

The exact origins of penne alla vodka are unclear and, to some extent, the subject of urban legend and folklore. The first attested recipe is in 1974, in the cookbook L'Abbuffone by the Italian actor Ugo Tognazzi; he called it pasta all'infuriata 'pasta, enraged style', described as a sort of pasta all'arrabbiata, made with penne, fresh peeled tomatoes, a shot of vodka, chili pepper, oil, garlic, and bay leaves. Tognazzi suggested also that, if using a Polish vodka with chili ("formidable, tremendous, very strong, very hot, deadly"), the fresh chili pepper can be omitted.

There have been multiple, often conflicting, claims to the invention and history of the dish; one author claims that it was invented at Dante, a restaurant in Bologna. One cookbook claims that it was invented in the 1980s by a Roman chef for a vodka company that wanted to popularize its product in Italy. The dish may have been common in Italy before becoming popular in America in the early 1980s. Luigi Franzese of Orsini's Restaurant in New York City claims to have improvised the dish in the 1970s when using vodka to reduce a tomato sauce, calling it Penne à la Russia. A 1979 Italian novel mentions a "sugo alla russa" which includes a glass of vodka.

On October 25, 2016, the Italian Association of Confectionery and Pasta Industries named it the symbolic dish of the 18th World Pasta Day organized in Moscow, as a symbol of friendship between Italy and Russia. Barilla later found penne alla vodka was the second most sought-after dish of pasta in search engines, behind only pasta alla bolognese.

== Composition ==
The ethanol of the vodka enhances and balances the flavors of the tomato and cream. Half or more of the vodka evaporates during cooking.

Similar tomato and cream sauces without vodka are sometimes known as parma rosa or rosatella.

In the U.S., bacon or guanciale are often substituted for pancetta.

== In media ==
The 2022 short documentary film Disco Sauce: The True Story of Penne Alla Vodka, directed by Roberto Serrini, examines the history, composition and variations of penne alla vodka. It features the chefs Pasquale Cozzolino, Gaetano Arnone, Jae Lee, JJ Johnson, and Jeremy Spector, and the molecular gastronomist Hervé This. Its director called it "insatiably irreverent" and a reviewer characterized it as "gonzo style". It has received multiple awards.

== See also ==
- List of pasta
- List of pasta dishes
