= Carbonara =

Italian pasta dish

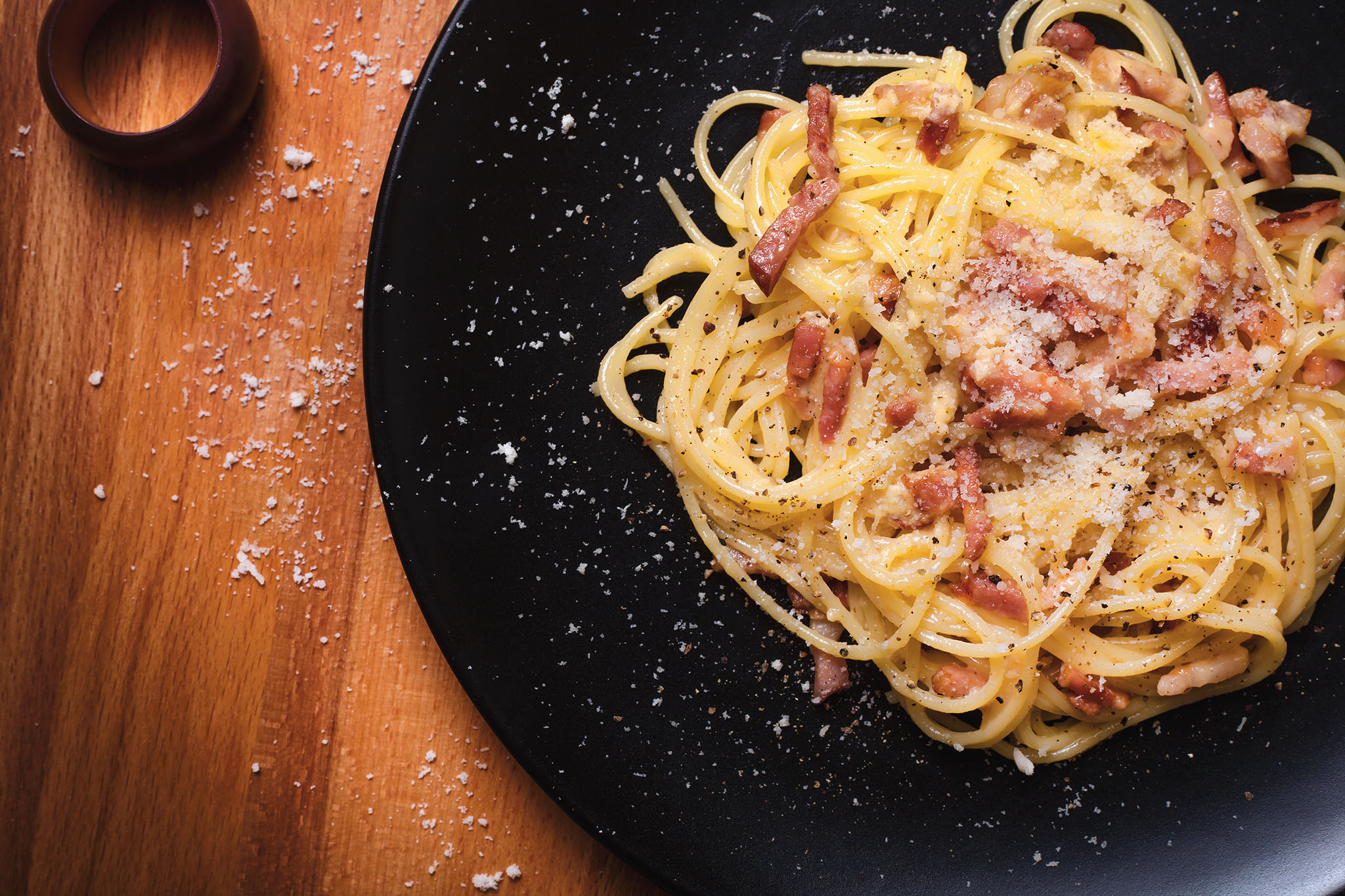
- Spaghetti alla carbonara
- Alternative names: Pasta alla carbonara
- Course: Primo (Italian course)
- Place of origin: Italy
- Region or state: Lazio
- Main ingredients: Pasta (usually spaghetti), guanciale (alternatively pancetta), pecorino romano, eggs, black pepper

Carbonara (Italian: [karboˈnaːra]) is a pasta dish made with cured pork, hard cheese, eggs, salt, and black pepper. It is typical of the Lazio region of Italy. The dish took its modern form and name in the middle of the 20th century.

The cheese used is usually pecorino romano. Some variations use Parmesan, Grana Padano, or a combination of cheeses. Spaghetti is the most common pasta, but bucatini or rigatoni are also used. While guanciale, a cured pork jowl, is traditional, some variations use pancetta, and lardons of smoked bacon are a common substitute outside Italy.

== Origin and history ==
As with many recipes, the origins of the dish and its name are obscure; most Italian sources trace its origin to the region of Lazio.

The names pasta alla carbonara and spaghetti alla carbonara are unrecorded before the Second World War; notably, it is absent from Ada Boni's 1930 La cucina romana (lit. 'Roman cuisine'). The 1931 edition of the Guide of Italy of the TCI describes a pasta (strascinati) dish from Cascia and Monteleone di Spoleto, in Umbria, whose sauce contains whipped eggs, sausage, and pork fat and lean, which could be considered as a precursor of carbonara, although it does not contain any cheese.

The name spaghetti alla carbonara first appears in print in a 1939 Dutch East Indies newspaper (De Koerier), which mentions a restaurant in the Trastevere region of Rome that was known for a dish by that name, but does not describe the dish itself. In 1950, the Italian newspaper La Stampa said that American officers had been seeking out "spaghetti alla carbonara" in Trastevere restaurants for years, but similarly didn't describe it.

The first attested recipe is in an illustrated cookbook published in Chicago in 1952 by Patricia Bronté. It should also be noted that a major Italian cookbook published in 1950, Il cucchiaio d'argento, has no mention of this dish.

In 1954, the first recipe for carbonara published in Italy appeared in La Cucina Italiana magazine, although the recipe featured pancetta, garlic, and Gruyère cheese. The same year, carbonara was included in Elizabeth David's Italian Food, an English-language cookbook published in Great Britain.

=== Etymology ===
There are many theories for the origin of the name carbonara, which probably did not coincide with the creation of than the dish itself:

- Since the name is derived from carbonaro, some people presume the dish was first made as a hearty meal for Italian charcoal workers.
- Similarly, Pietro Lencioni, the Italian-American whose restaurant produced the first published "carbonara" recipe, was born into an immigrant coal-mining family in Iowa. His cooking is portrayed as reflecting this influence in Bronté's 1952 cookbook.
- John F. Mariani writes that some people think it was created as a tribute to the Carbonari (lit. 'charcoal burners') secret society prominent in the early, repressed stages of Italian unification (Risorgimento) in the early 19th century.

=== Pre-WW2 theory of origin ===
The dish forms part of a family of dishes consisting of pasta with cured pork, cheese, and pepper, one of which is pasta alla gricia. It is very similar to pasta cacio e uova, a dish dressed with melted lard and a mixture of eggs and cheese, but not meat or pepper. Cacio e uova is documented as far back as 1839 and, according to some researchers, anecdotal evidence indicates that some Italians born before World War II associate that name with the dish now known as "carbonara".

Gillian Riley comments that carbonara is likely an "urban dish" from Rome.

=== WW2 theory of origin ===
A review of the history of carbonara's appearance in cookbooks and other forms of media (see above) supports a post-World War II origin of this dish after the Allied liberation of Rome in 1944. This is the opinion of the food writer Alan Davidson, the food blogger and historian Luca Cesari, and the historian Eleonora Cozzella. Multiple sources report that Allied personnel enjoyed the dish and played a role in its genesis by providing abundant ingredients such as bacon and cheese.

According to one narrative, a young Italian Army cook, Renato Gualandi, created the dish in 1944, with other Italian cooks, as part of a dinner for the U.S. Army, because the Americans "had fabulous bacon, very good cream, some cheese and powdered egg yolks".

According to interviews and archival research by Eleonora Cozzella, the dish was born out of a dish called "spaghetti breakfast" that would be requested by Allied personnel when they visit Italian cook shops: a kind of bacon and eggs served on top of spaghetti. The British historian Luca Cesari concurs, saying that bacon and eggs as a combination was more familiar to Americans and British than it was to Italians at that time.

=== Evolution after creation ===
Carbonara was first described in a 1952 cookbook about food in Chicago. Cesari writes that the recipe was probably brought to the United States by an American serviceman who had passed through Rome during the Italian campaign or by an Italian American who had encountered it in Rome, making carbonara a dish that closely links Italy and the United States. The Italian academic Alberto Grandi has said that carbonara's first attested recipe is American, citing Cesari, a claim that has been criticized in Italy.

The version of the dish found in the 1954 La Cucina Italiana slowly evolved into the "canonical" carbonara of today. Pecorino and guanciale slowly made their way into carbonara recipes in the late 1950s and the 1960s. Recipes from that time still featured cream: in fact, the widespread removal of cream only happened in the 1990s. Grandi and Cesari comment that the removal of ingredients appear to be motivated by a wish to have the dish fit better with the "idyllic Italian stereotype of the rustic kitchen".

== Preparation ==
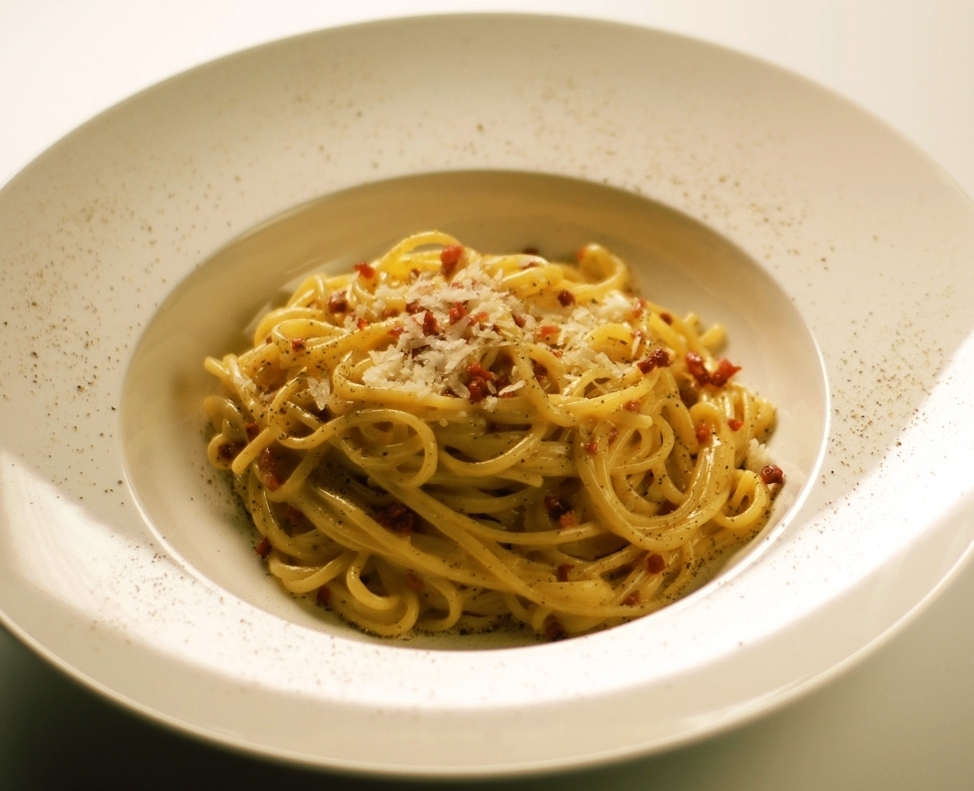
Spaghetti alla carbonara

The pasta is cooked in boiling water salted only moderately, due to the saltiness of the cured meat and the hard cheese. The meat is briefly fried in a pan in its own fat. A mixture of raw eggs (or yolks), grated cheese, and a liberal amount of ground black pepper is combined with the hot pasta either in the pasta pot or in a serving dish or bain-marie, but away from direct heat, to avoid curdling the egg. The fried meat is then added and the mixture is tossed, creating a rich, creamy sauce with bits of meat spread throughout. Various shapes of pasta can be used, almost always dried durum wheat pasta.

== Variations ==
Guanciale is the most commonly used meat for the dish in Italy, but pancetta and pancetta affumicata ('smoked pancetta') are also used and, in English-speaking countries, bacon is often used as a substitute. The usual cheese is pecorino romano; occasionally Parmesan, Grana Padano, or a combination of hard cheeses are used. Recipes differ as to which part of the egg is used—some use the whole egg, some others only the yolk, and still others a mixture. The amount of eggs used also vary, but the intended result is a creamy sauce from mild heating. For vegetarians or those observing Jewish kosher laws, there are also recipes that use mushrooms and vegetables instead of meat.

Some preparations have more sauce and therefore use tubular pasta, such as penne, which is better suited to holding sauce. Cream is not used in most Italian recipes, with some notable exceptions from the 20th century. However, it is often employed in other countries, as adding cream makes the dish more stable. Similarly, garlic is found in some recipes, but mostly outside Italy. Outside Italy, variations on carbonara may include green peas, broccoli, tenderstem broccoli, leeks, onions, other vegetables or mushrooms, and may substitute a meat such as ham or coppa for the fattier guanciale or pancetta.

== Sauce ==
A product described as carbonara sauce is sold as a ready-to-eat convenience food in grocery stores in many countries. Unlike the original preparation, which is inseparable from its dish as its creamy texture is created on the pasta itself, the ultra-processed versions of carbonara are prepared sauces to be applied onto separately cooked pasta. They may be thickened with cream and sometimes food starch, and often use bacon or cubed pancetta slices instead of guanciale.

== Gallery ==
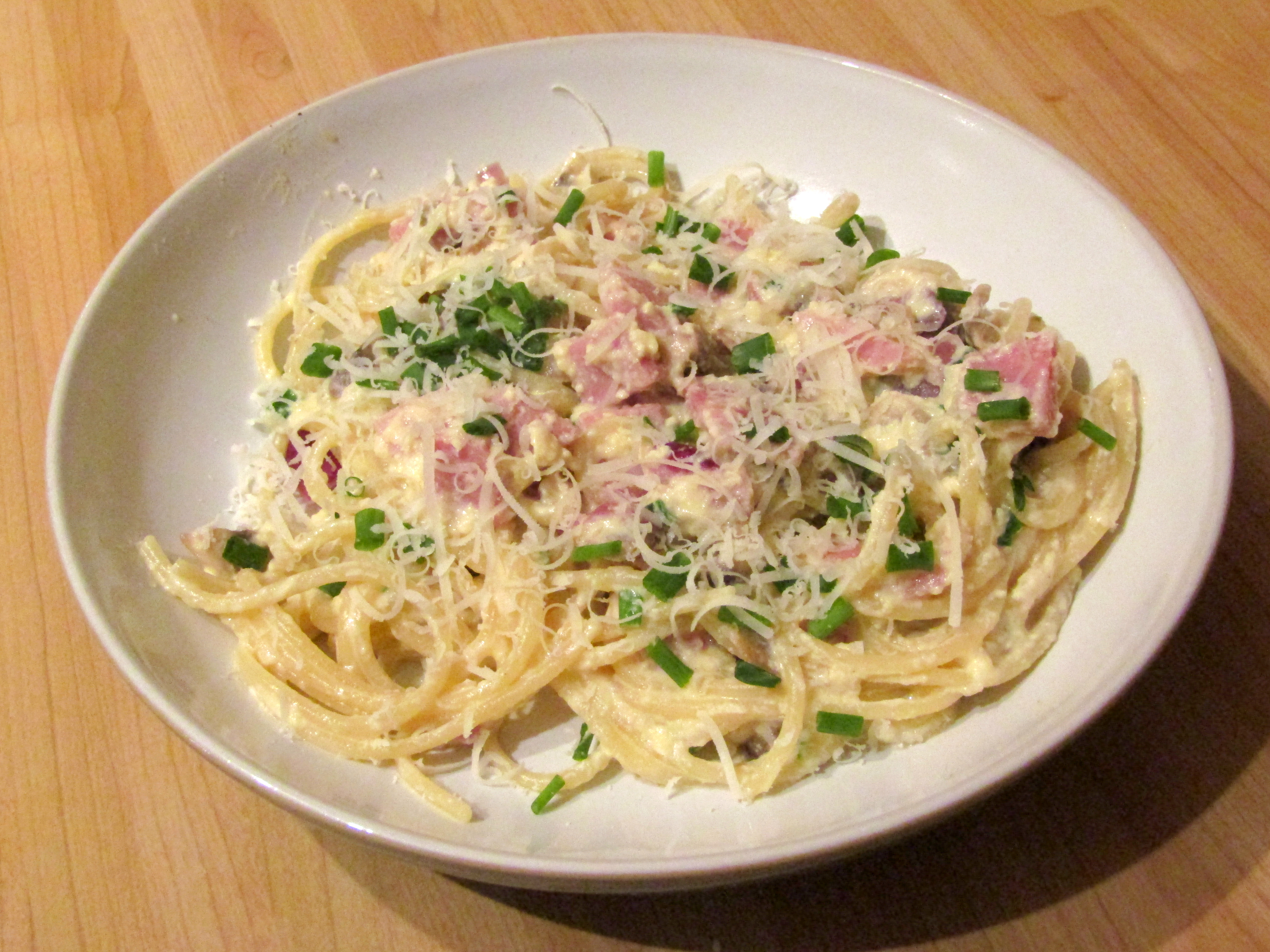

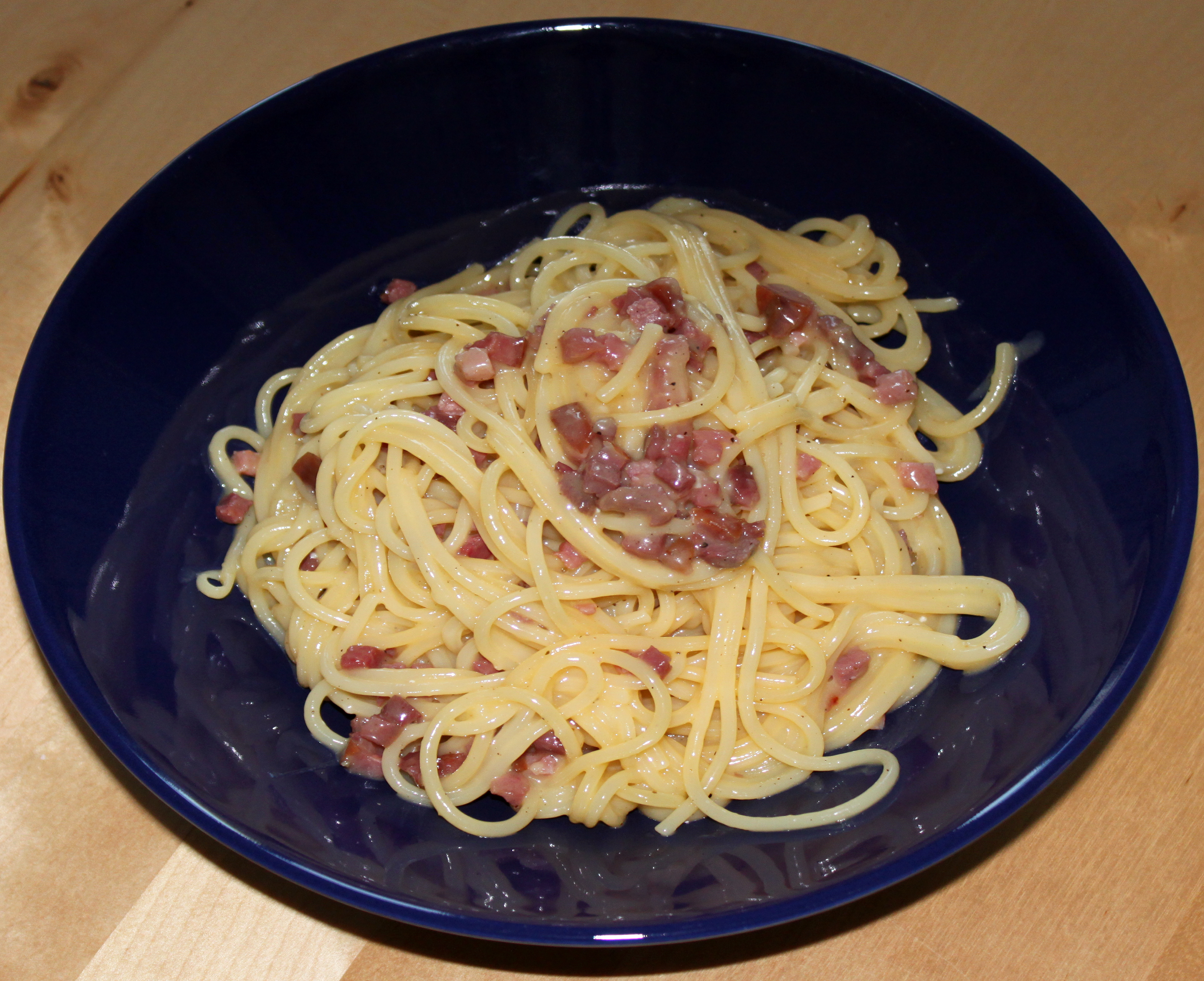

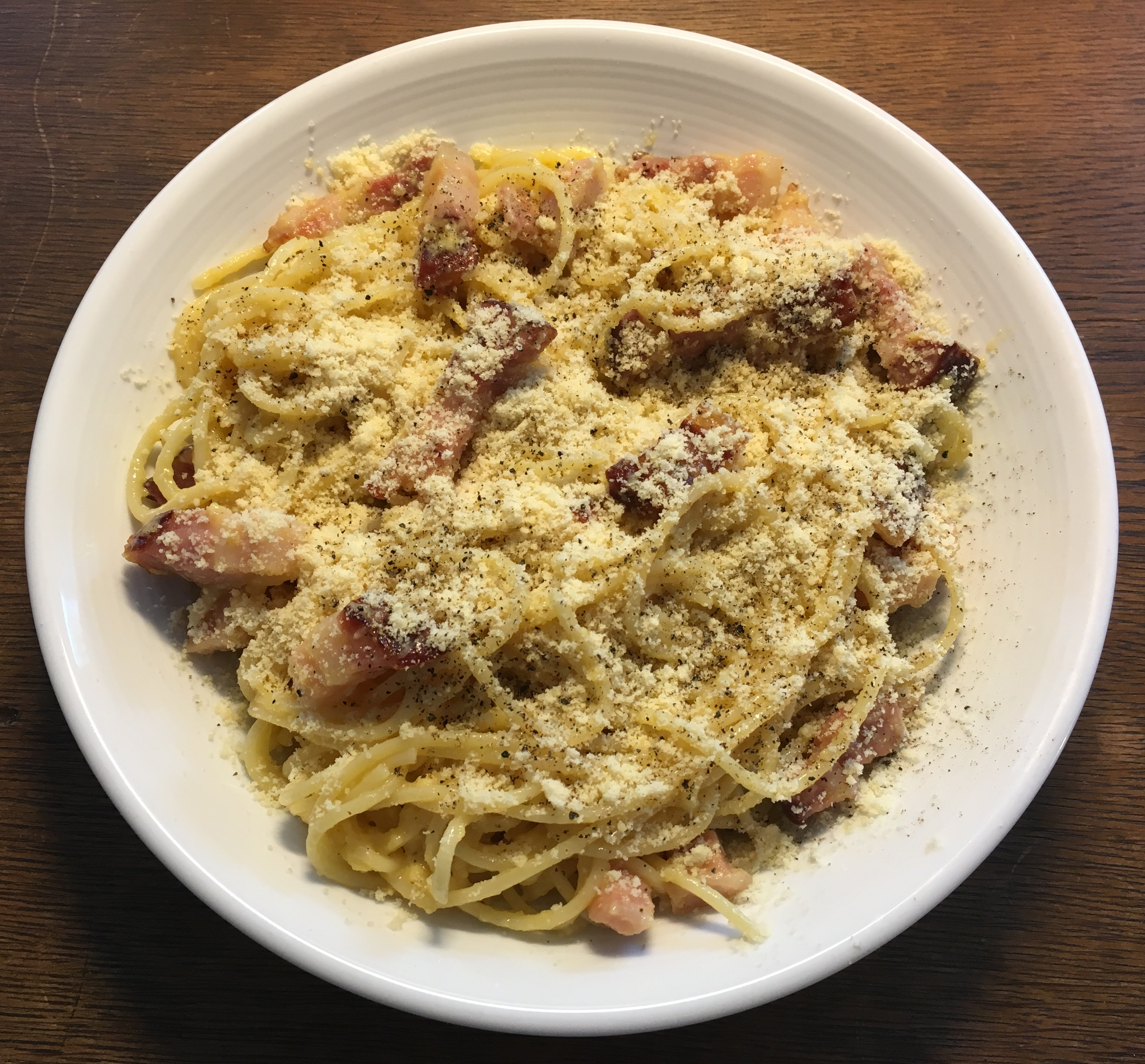

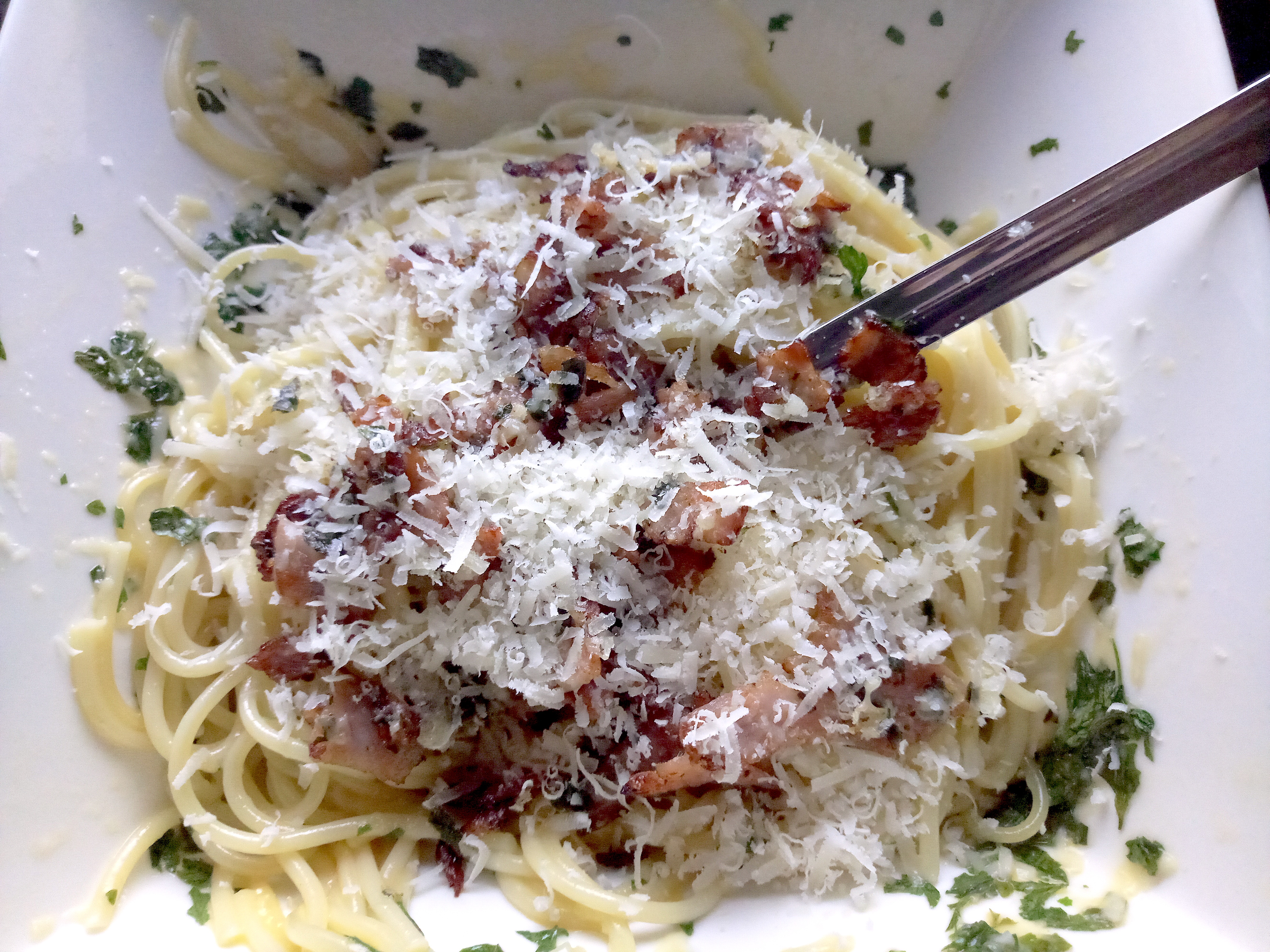

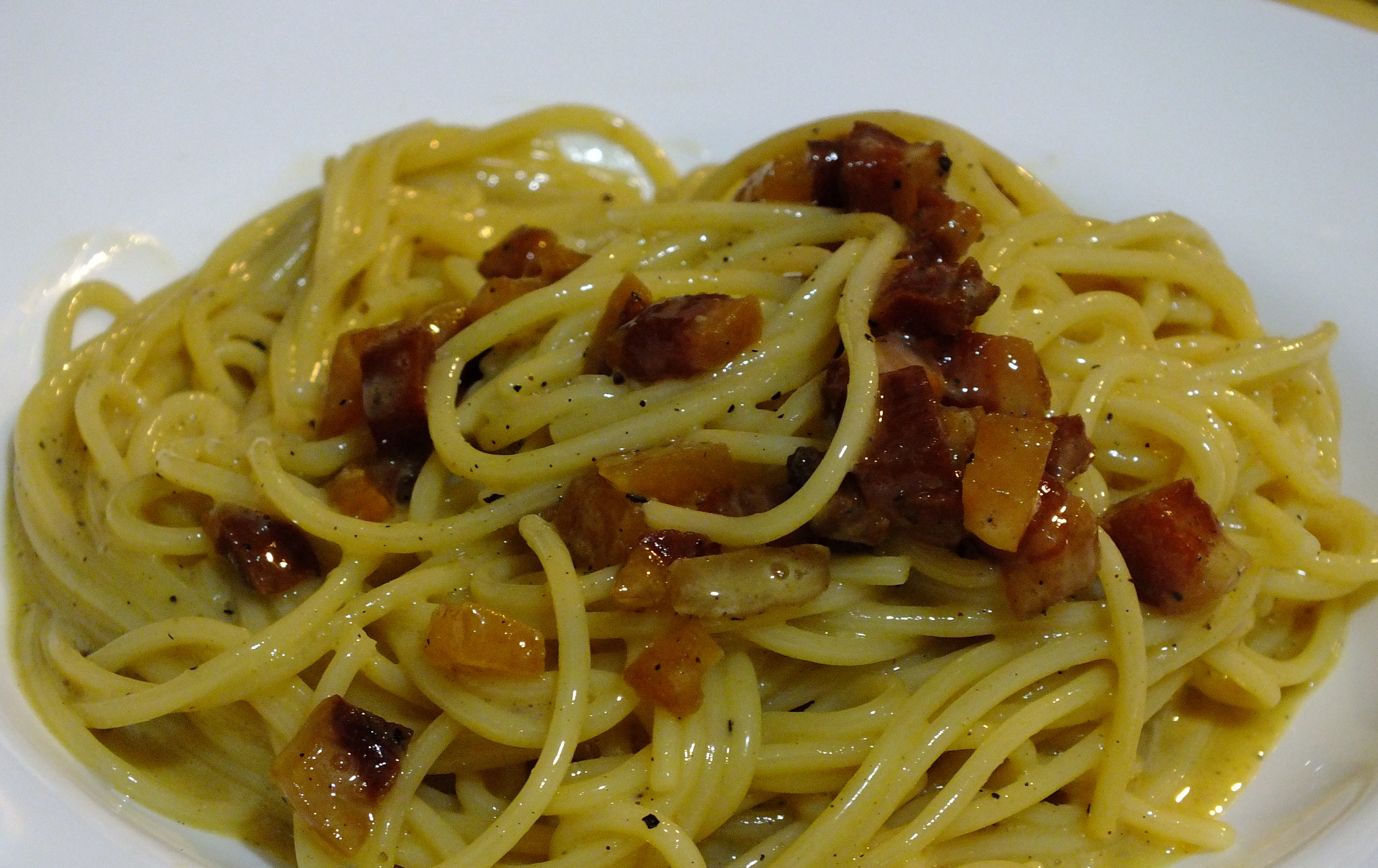

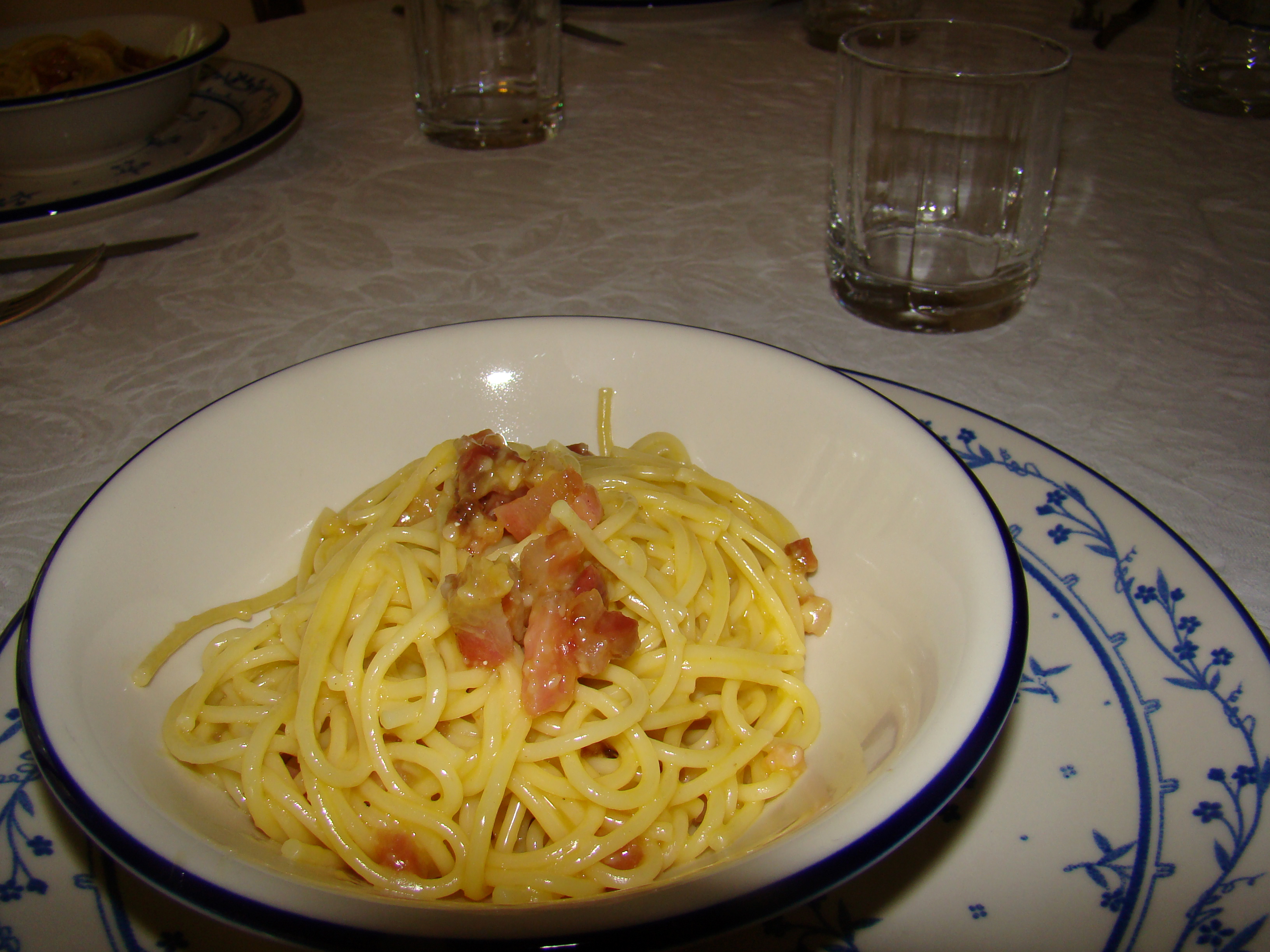

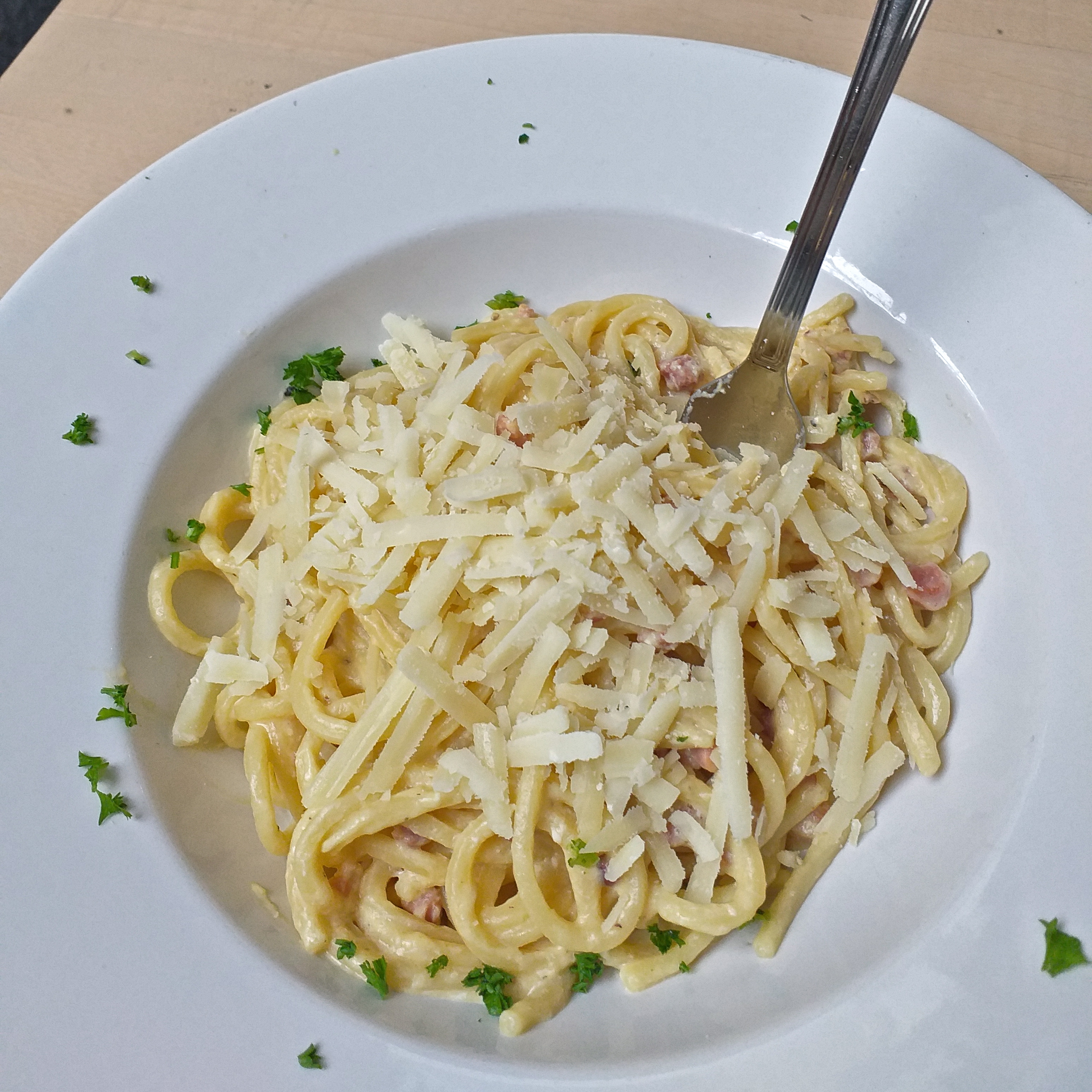

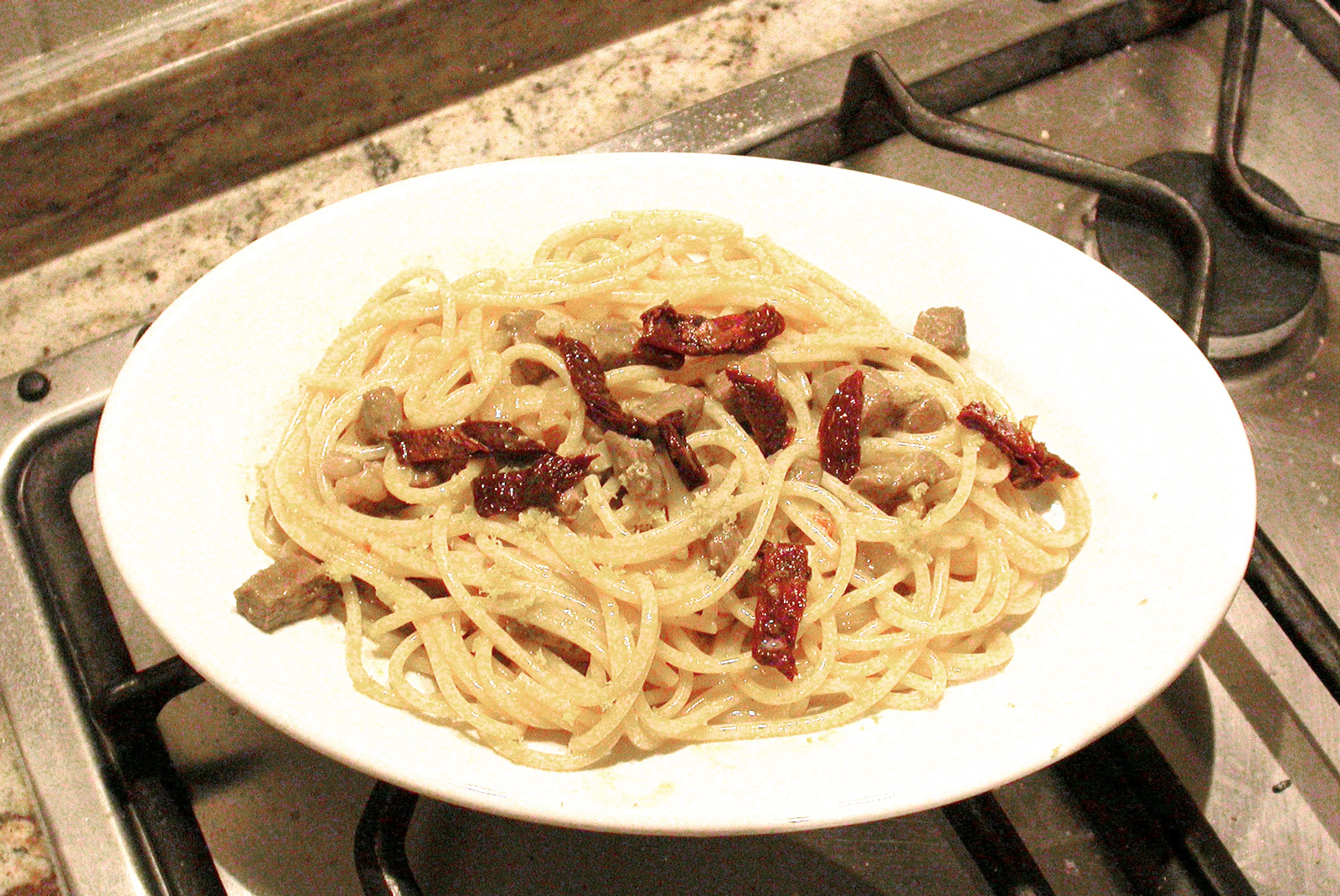

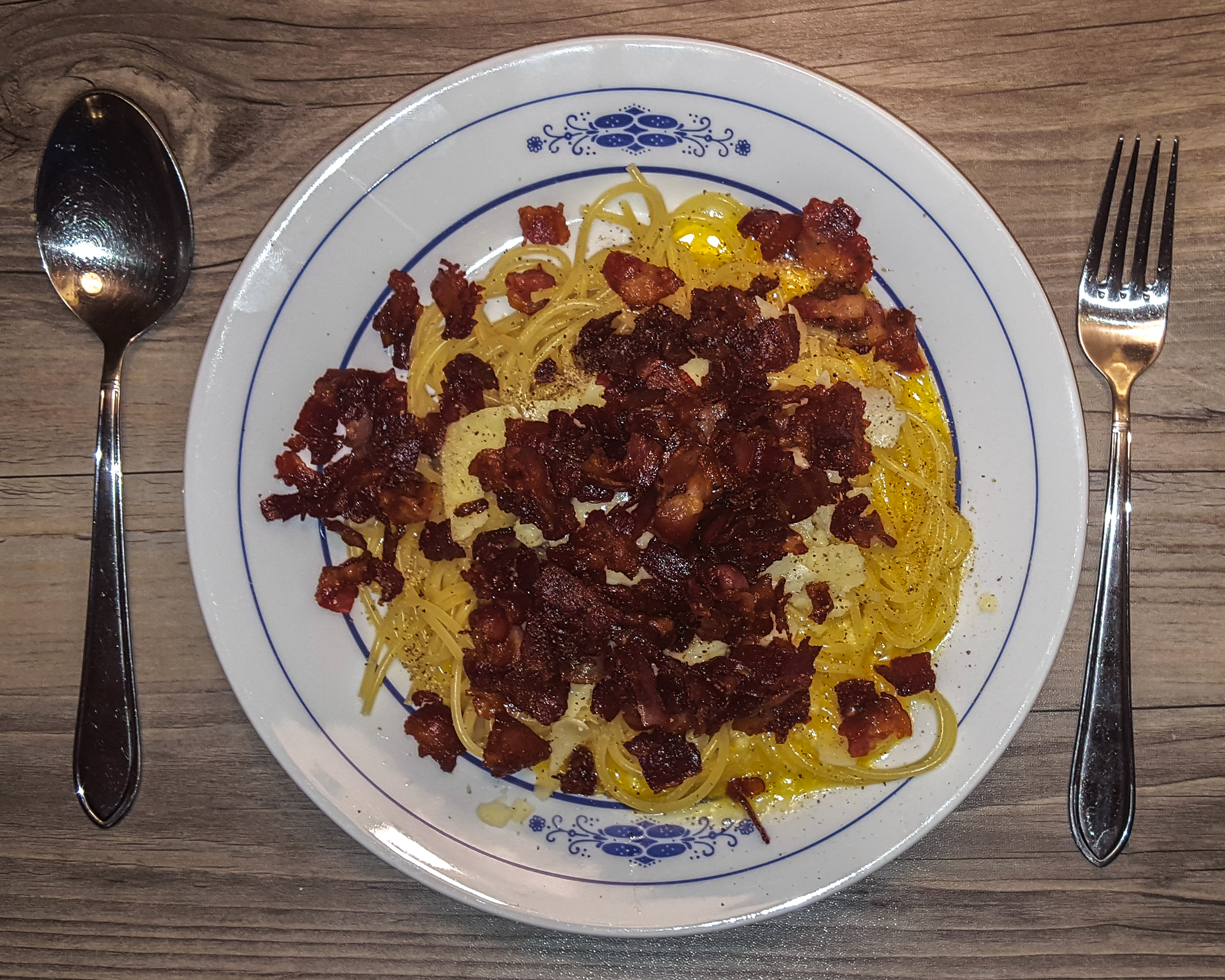

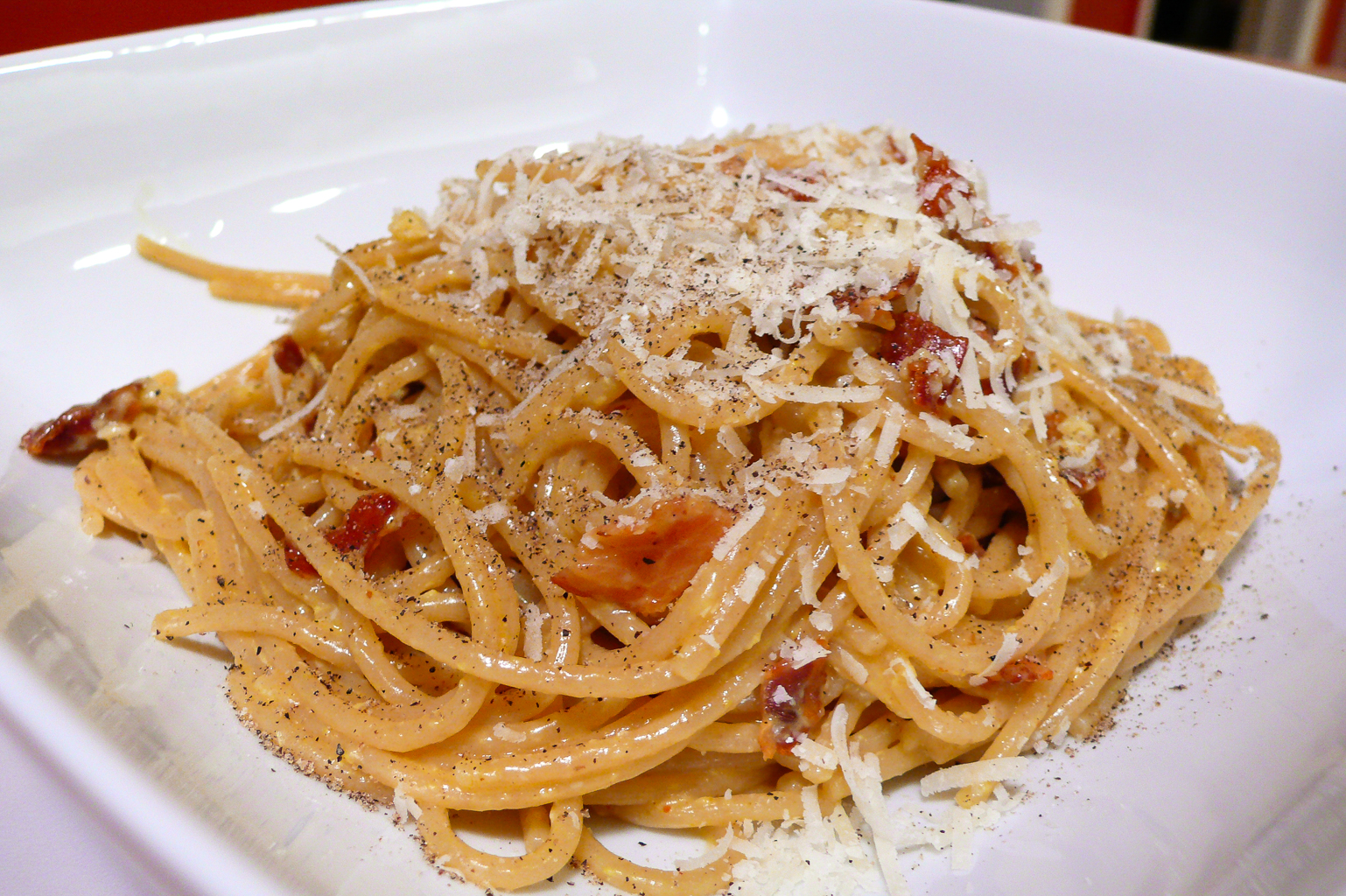

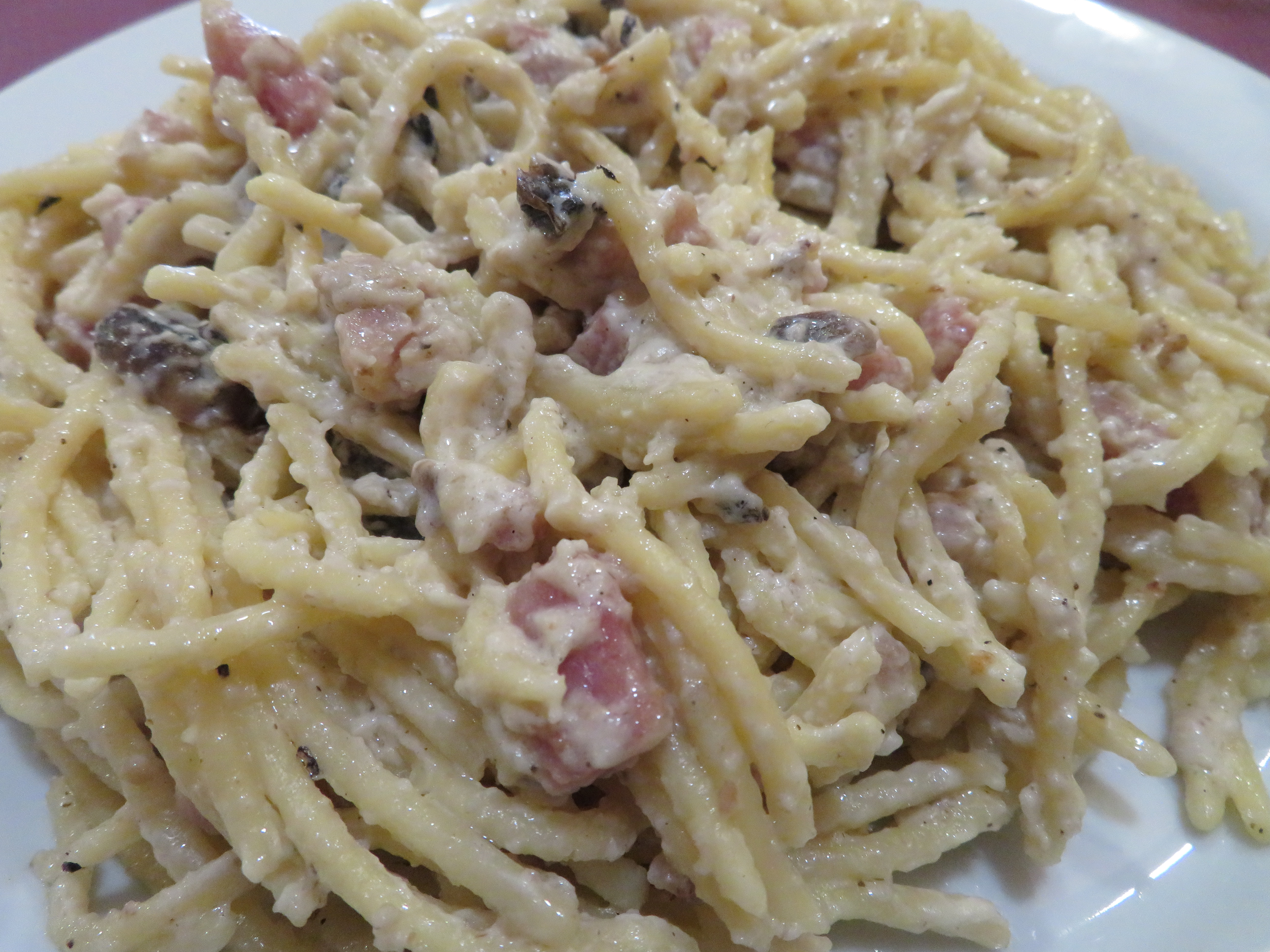

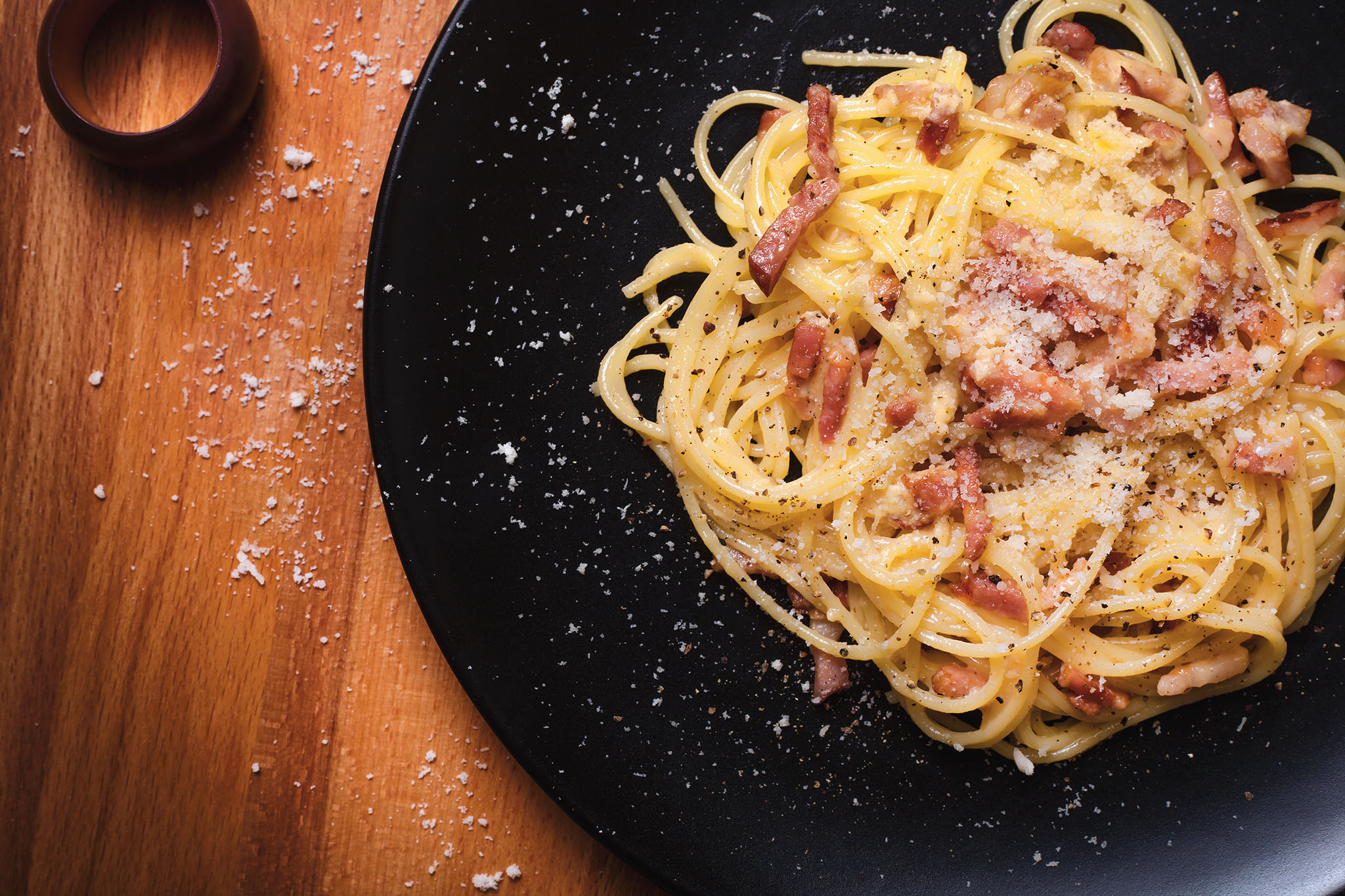

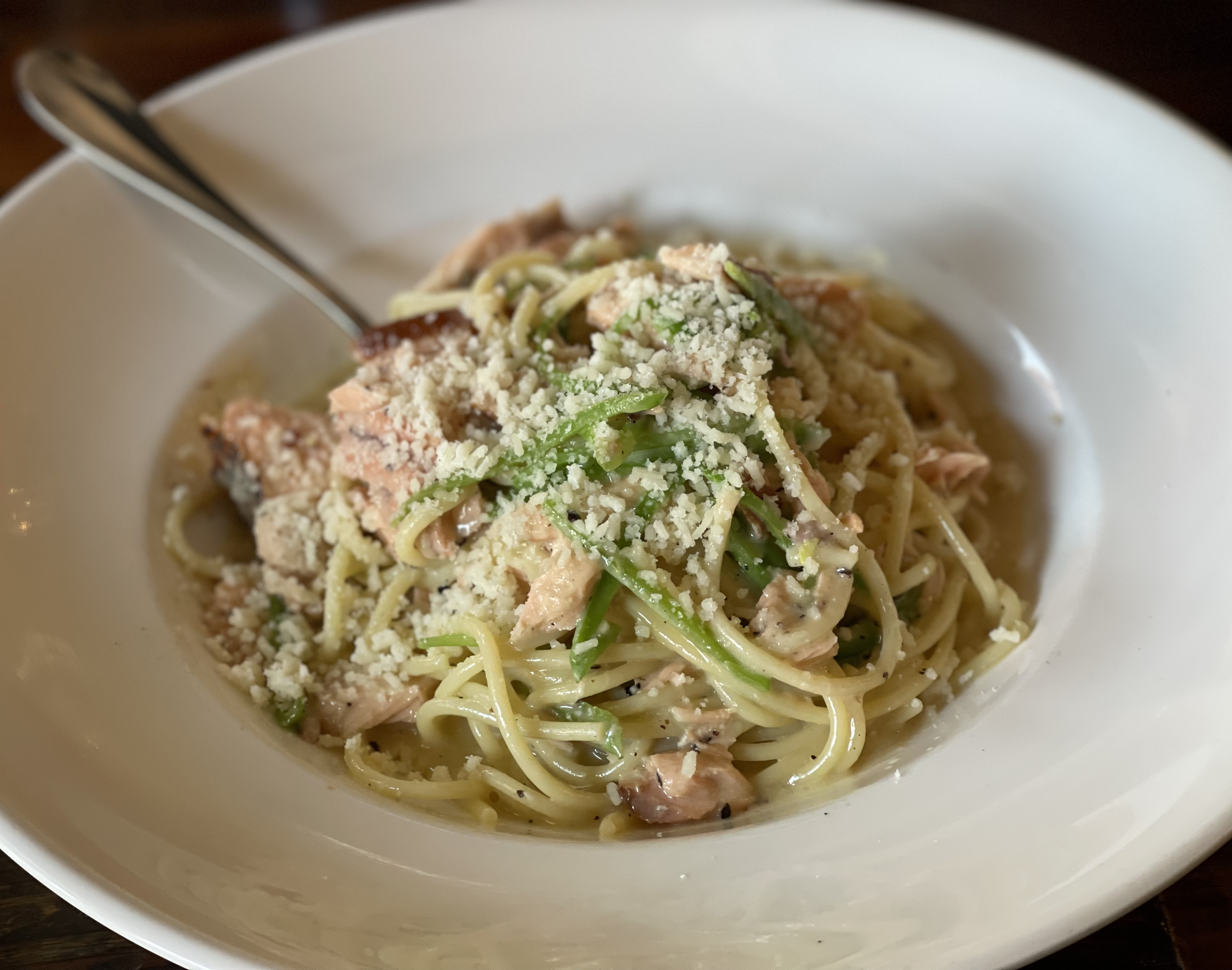

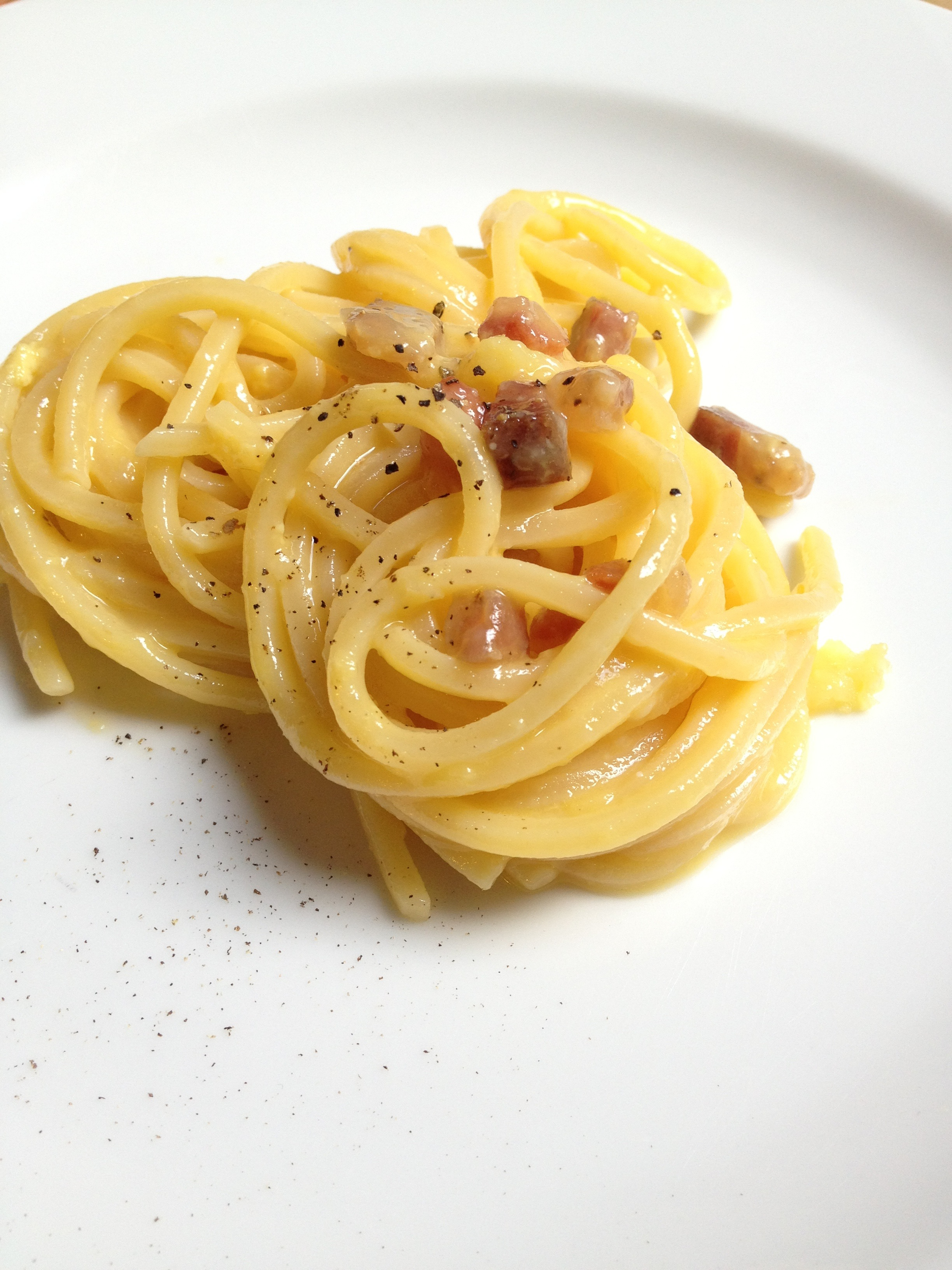

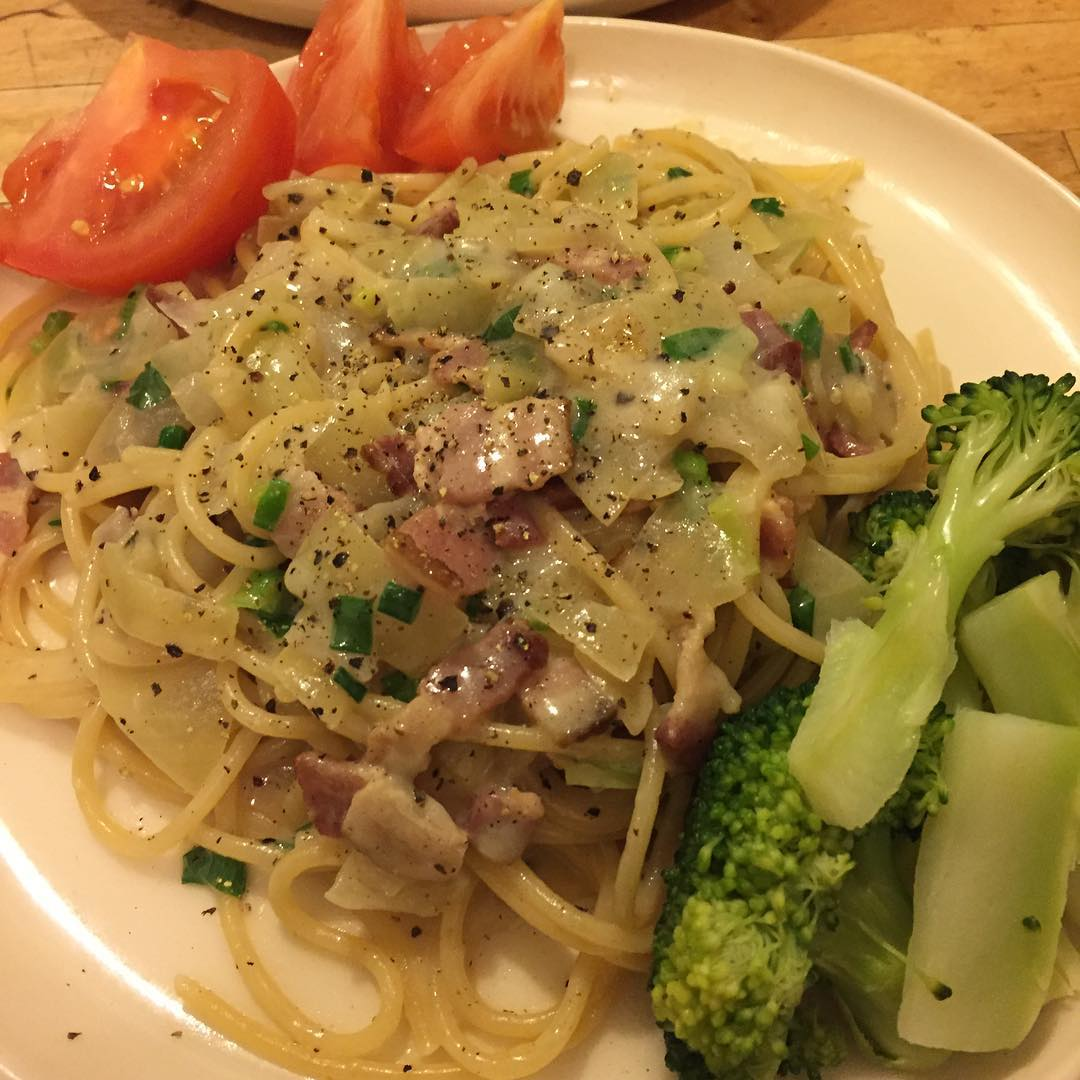

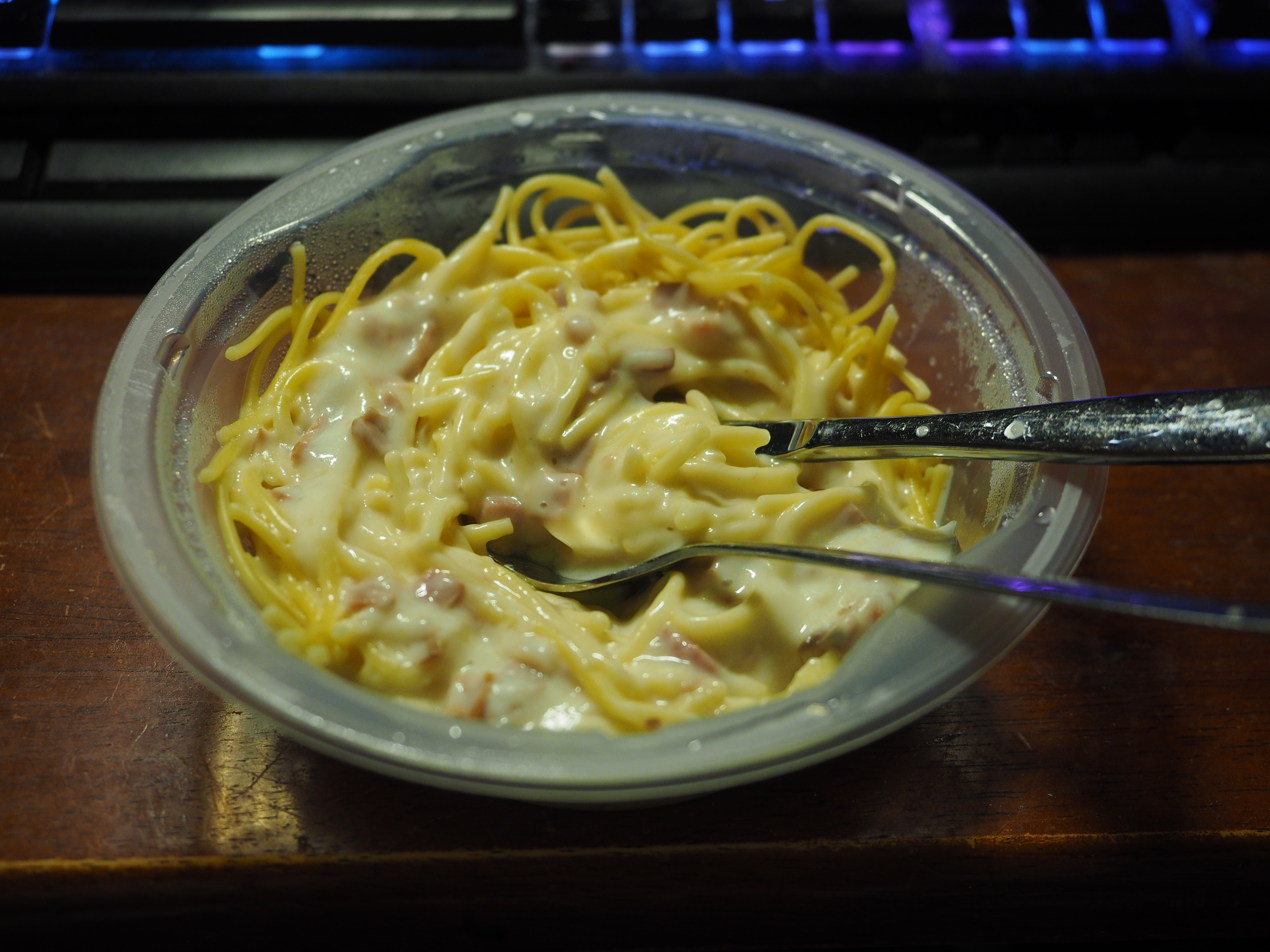

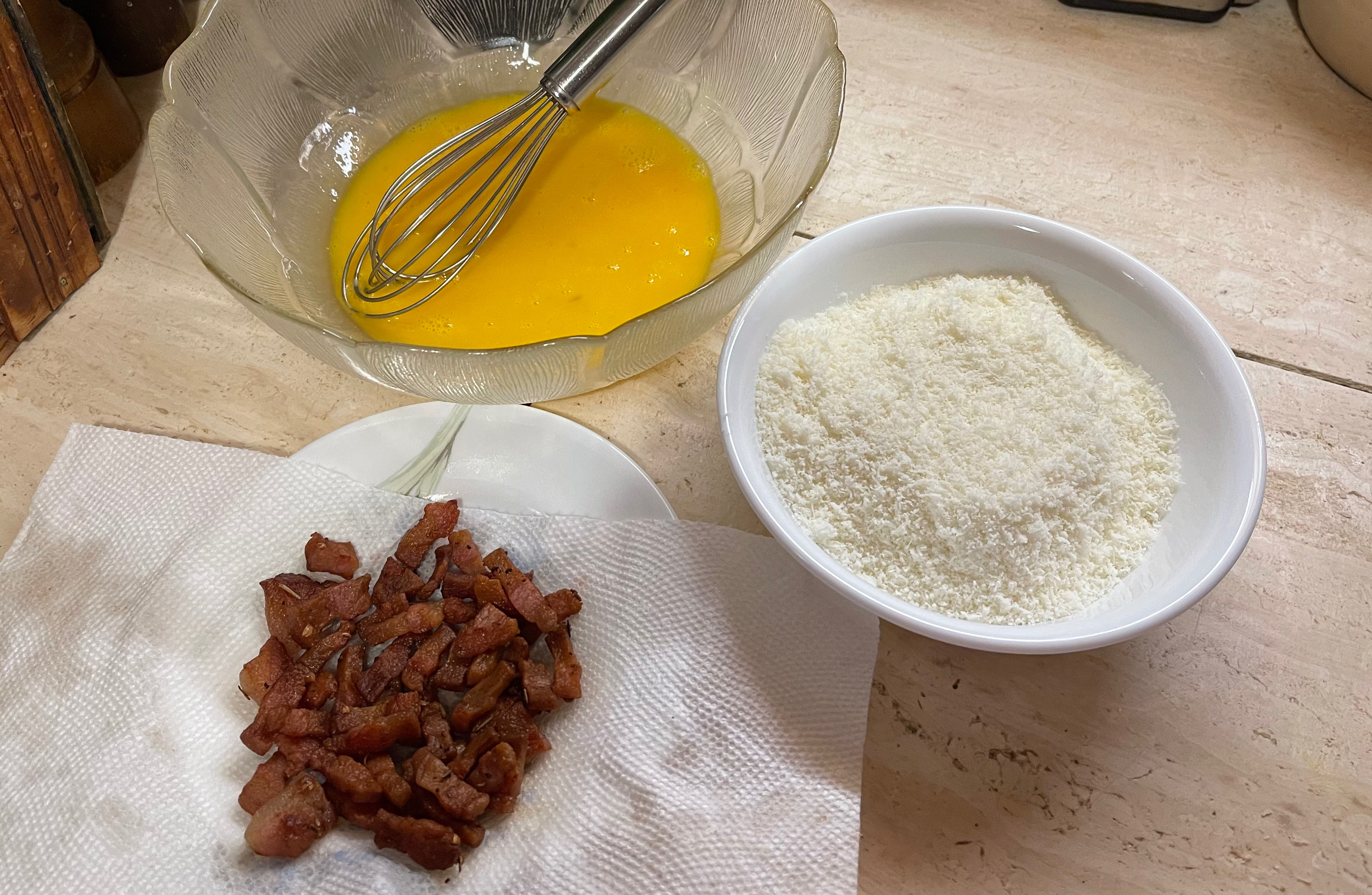

== See also ==
Media related to Carbonara at Wikimedia Commons Spaghetti alla Carbonara at the Wikibooks Cookbook subproject

- Roman cuisine
- List of pasta
- List of pasta dishes
