= Cozzolino =

Cozzolino is an Italian surname. Notable people with the surname include:

- Andrea Cozzolino (born 1962), Italian politician
- Dominic Cozzolino (born 1994), Canadian ice sledge hockey player
- Giuseppe Cozzolino (born 1985), Italian footballer
- Kei Cozzolino (born 1987), Japanese-born Italian racing driver
- Pasquale Cozzolino (born 1977), a Neapolitan chef based in New York

== See also ==
- Leandro Cuzzolino (born 1987), Argentine futsal player
