= Alberto Grandi =

Italian academic

- Born: 1967 (age 58–59)

Academic background
- Education: University of Bologna (BA); Bocconi University (PhD)

Academic work
- Discipline: Marxism

Alberto Grandi (born 1967) is an Italian Marxist academic and professor of Economics and Management at the University of Parma.

== Early life ==
He obtained his Political Science degree from the University of Bologna in 1992, and in 1997 defended his PhD in Economic and Social History at the Bocconi University in Milan.

== Career ==
In 1998, Grandi obtained a post-doctoral fellowship in Economic History at the Faculty of Economics of the University of Parma, wherefrom, in 1999, he was awarded a four-year research grant in the field of Economic History. In 2001, he was named Researcher in Economic History at the same university.

Grandi has worked on guilds in early modern Europe and on the regional development of 20th-century Italy. His research on the history of food history has focused on the emergence of typical products and designations of origin, leading to work on the notion of typicality in a social context. On the notion of typicality, he examined how food products are characterized and sought by the consuming public on the basis of what are considered to be their "intrinsic characteristics", such as quality, taste, smell, and so on, and also their "symbolic properties", such as their name, the tradition and the history accompanying the product, etc. Further, he examined the relationship between "original" typical products and their imitations, using as a main example, the history of "one of the most copied" food products, the Modena balsamico. In his work on the general notion of the invention of tradition he is stated he follows the precedent of British Marxist historian Eric Hobsbawm.

In 2018, he published Denominazione di Origine Inventata ('Invented Designations of Origin') and started a podcast titled "DOI", the Italian initials of the book's title, in which he presented his claims about the origin of pizza, of which, he stated most Italians first heard in the 1950s, about carbonara being a strictly American recipe, and so on. The podcast lasted three seasons and scored more than one million downloads.

His 2022 book on artificial or preserved cold (see: Refrigeration § History) examined how it has ostensibly, in general, been a luxury and a privilege historically available mostly to social elites everywhere. The search for controlled cool in everyday life, Grandi offered, was full of evident technical obstacles that were overcome only in the second half of the 19th century with the invention of the machine that artificially produced ice.

In 2024, Grandi and Daniele Soffiati published La cucina italiana non esiste ('Italian Cuisine Does Not Exist'), which makes the claim that modern Italian cuisine is a recent invention and is heavily influenced by emigration and the reintroduction of international Italian-style cooking, stating that, "I may be seen as the enemy here in Italy, but this country has done well to create an image of its food and wine which did not exist as recently as 50 years ago."

== Controversies ==
Grandi prefers to take a long-term view on the evolution of food products, with a special emphasis on an external social context. He has accordingly made controversial claims about pizza, carbonara, and Italian cuisine in general (see his 2018 and 2024 books mentioned above). He describes popular Italian culinary "traditions" as, in fact, products of gastronationalism, the use of a recent public obsession of the provenance of food to construct and strengthen a certain national identity. Besides making these claims, he also enters controversies by responding to current events.

When Grandi presented his claims about carbonara at a 2018 literary festival held in Aosta, the presenter reportedly "called [him] every name in the book".

In 2019, a suggestion was made by Matteo Zuppi, archbishop of Bologna, that "pork-free" tortellini should be produced under the name benvenuti tortellini ('welcome tortellini') and added to the menu at the city's San Petronio feast, as a gesture of inclusion towards the city's Muslim inhabitants. Matteo Salvini of Lega Nord objected, stating that some people are "trying to erase our history [and] our culture". Grandi intervened stating publicly that, until the late 19th century, tortellini filling did not in fact contain pork at all. The president of Bologna's tortellini consortium confirmed that Grandi's claim was correct, since, in the oldest recipes, the filling was poultry.

On March 23, 2023, the Financial Times published an interview of Grandi, where he repeats many of the same claims previously made, and makes a new claim about an alleged recent origin of the familiar large-wheeled and hard form of Parmesan cheese. The article also mentions a 2022 proposal by Melon's minister of agriculture Francesco Lollobrigida to form a task force that would monitor "quality standards" in Italian restaurants around the world, citing the threat of chefs getting recipes "wrong" or using ingredients that "aren't Italian": an example of Italian food as "a leitmotif for rightwing politicians". Coincidentally, the Meloni government announced the submission of a request to UNESCO for the Italian cuisine to be considered part of the country's Intangible Cultural Heritage on the same day. UNSECO is expected to produce a decision on the proposal by 2025.

The Financial Times interview exposed a large audience, Italian and domestic, to Grandi's controversial views. His remarks were met with a significant amount of criticism and protests by Italian chefs, food critics, historians, politicians, the Italian media, as well as food professionals. In a March 27 interview by la Repubblica, Grandi stated in response:

Italian cuisine is assuming an identity dimension beyond all reason. Pavlovian reactions that make no sense are now taking place. I don't understand why many people attack me since I don't question the quality of Italian food or products; I reconstruct the history of these dishes in a historical and philologically correct manner. And with my studies I have shown that many preparations derive from the last 50–60 years of Italian history and from interactions with the Atlantic culture. The first recipe for carbonara is dated in 1953 Chicago. Carbonara did not exist in Italy before; it's Italian-American. The sauce on the pizza was born in New York and not in Naples, where it appears later.

Grandi added that the UNESCO bid "doesn't stand up anywhere" and asked, "what happens if we get it? Those who love it will continue to love it and those who don't like it will continue to dislike it", characterizing its contents as having "a lot of bullshit".
