= L'Ambrosiano =

Italian daily newspaper

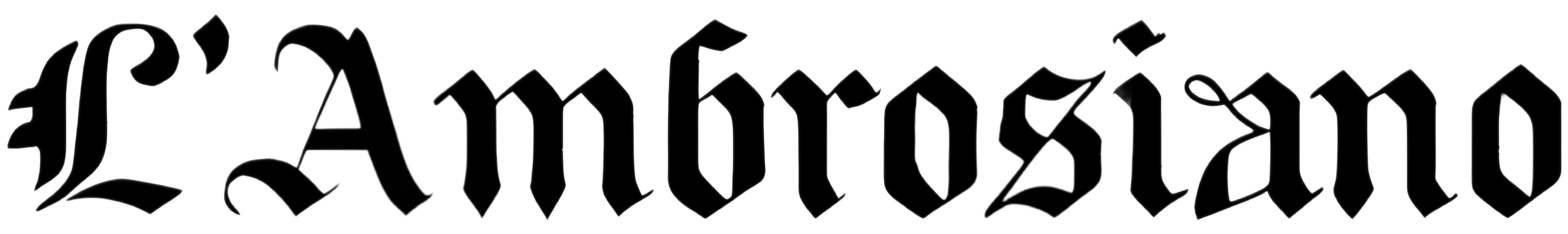

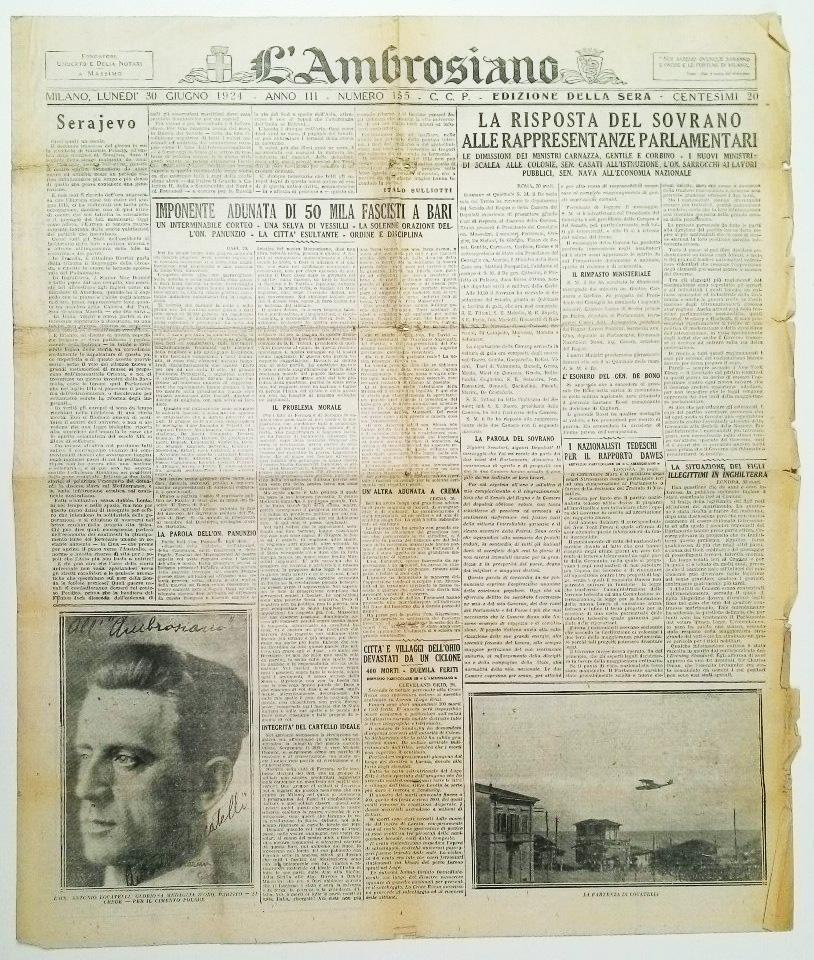
- Front page, 30 June 1924
- Type: Daily newspaper
- Founded: 7 December 1922
- Ceased publication: 18 January 1944
- Language: Italian
- Headquarters: Milan, Italy

L'Ambrosiano was a daily newspaper published in Milan from 1922 to January 1944.

== History ==
Founded by the futurist Umberto Notari, it was aimed at the Milanese middle class. The first issue of the newspaper came out on 7 December 1922. The newspaper was noticeable because the masthead was printed in red. In 1925 Notari was forced to sell the majority of the shares to a financial group headed by Riccardo Gualino. From that moment L'Ambrosiano became a daily newspaper of the regime.

An afternoon newspaper, it adopted innovative graphics for the time. The newspaper introduced several innovations, both in content and layout. On the third page, usually a serious space reserved for elzeviri and pieces of art, monothematic pages appeared on L'Ambrosiano, dedicated from time to time to literature, music, art and sport. The fourth page, not valued at the time in Italian newspapers (it contained brief news and commercial communications), was made entirely with photographs, about events and costume.

In 1930 the property was taken over by the Società Anonima Milanese Editrice (SAME), chaired by Arnaldo Mussolini. At the beginning of the new decade, L'Ambrosiano introduced a literary page every Wednesday, inaugurating a tradition that was later taken up by many other Italian newspapers. A newspaper always open to innovation, in 1938 the change of format was also experimented, adopting a tabloid, with the doubling of the foliation to 12 pages.

Holders of literary criticism were Gino Saviotti, Luciano Nicastro and a young Guido Piovene, at the beginning of a long journalistic career. Art criticism was entrusted to Carlo Carrà; the music critic was Adriano Lualdi. Authors who later became famous wrote on the pages of L'Ambrosiano: Carlo Emilio Gadda, who dealt with construction and life in Milan, publishing in the newspaper the prose which he then collected in his Castello di Udine (1934); Alfonso Gatto, who wrote about poetry; Elio Vittorini, who ranged from literature to architecture; Gaetano Afeltra, Riccardo Bacchelli, Camilla Cederna, Ada Negri, Delio Tessa and Salvatore Quasimodo. The newspaper was suppressed on 18 January 1944 and was replaced on 23 January by La Repubblica Fascista.

== Directors ==
- Umberto Notari (1922-1925)
- Enrico Cajumi (1925-1930)
- Giulio Benedetti (1930-1943)
- Nello Corradi (1943)
