= Beef cheek =

Cut of beef

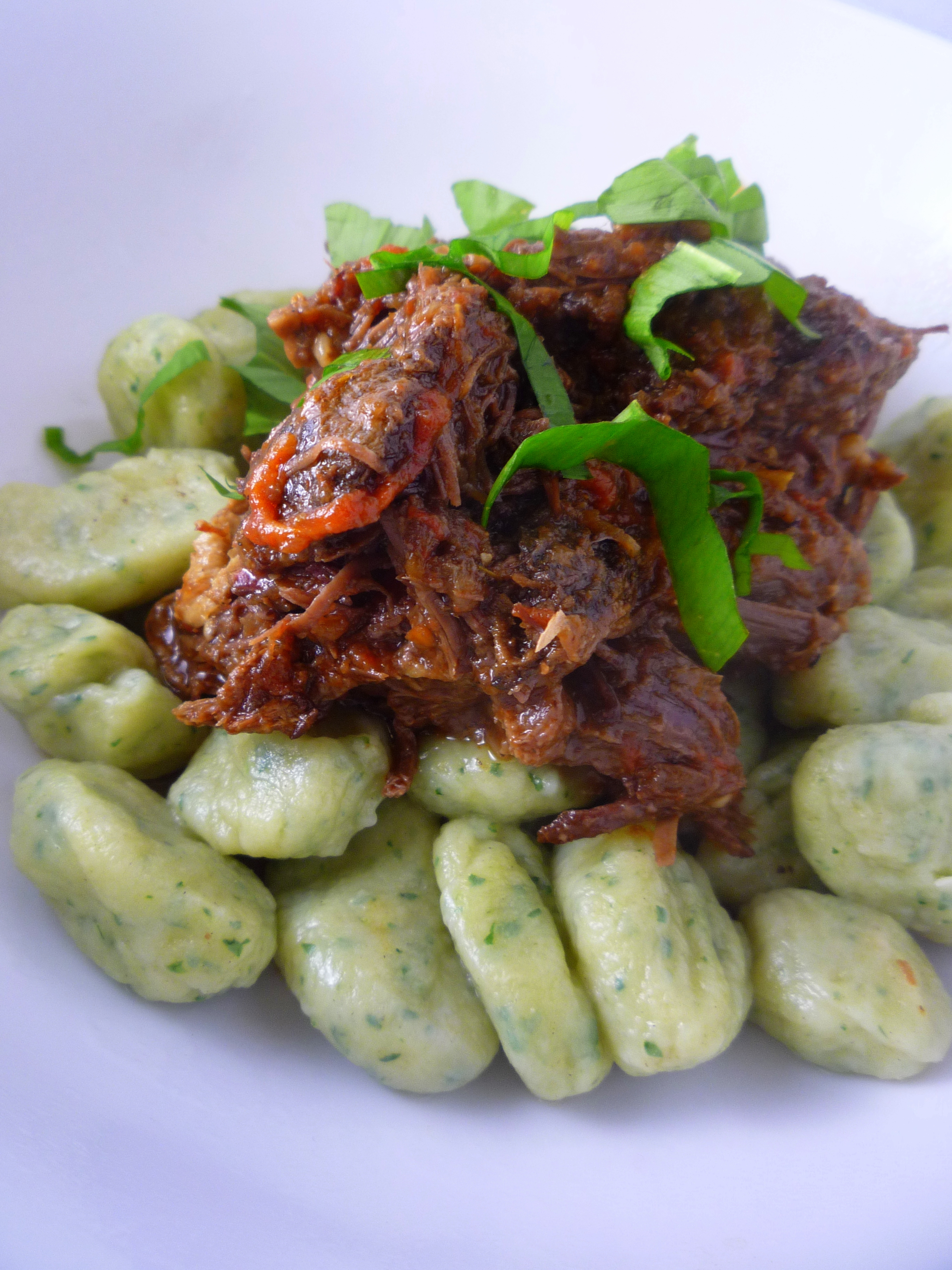
Wild garlic gnocchi and beef cheek ragù

Beef cheeks are a cut of beef taken from the heads of beef cattle. Beef cheeks and pig cheeks are both substantial enough to be cut out and sold separately at retail butcher shops and supermarkets. Veal cheeks, taken from a slaughtered calf rather than an adult cow, are smaller, more delicate, and less "meaty" than beef cheeks. Beef or veal cheeks are also known as masseter muscle, and are called joue in French and guancia in Italian (thus to guanciale, salt-cured pork jowl).

== Description and uses ==
Beef cheeks have historically been classified as offal. Beef cheeks are muscle-meat offal (as opposed to the softer organ-meat or viscera offal). Other kinds of muscle-meat offal include oxtail, calf's tongue, and beef heart. The texture of beef cheeks is said to be reminiscent of the texture of tongue or oxtail.

Removing beef or veal cheeks from a whole head entails "using a boning knife...make a cut under the eye to the bone. Keeping your knife on the bone, cut down and around the edge of the mouth to the jawbone to lift off the cheek meat in one piece." According to a 1919 report on the North American meatpacking industry:

Beef cheeks are the heavy muscles of the jaw and head. Their average weight is about 3.86 pounds (1.75 kg) per head. They also yield a small amount of tallow trimmings which are utilized in the oleo, and the parotid glands or No. 2 cheeks which are removed sometimes and used for pharmaceutical purposes. The No. 2 cheeks, however, are used more often in sausage and canned meats.

The cheeks of a cow (which used those muscles to chew cud) are typically "sinewy" and should be trimmed down by a butcher before being used by cooks. Barring that, cooks must trim excess fat, cut away stray flaps of meat, and remove the silverskin and fat, but "the veins of sinew running through the cheeks will melt during cooking."

A comparatively affordable cut of meat, beef cheeks are often used as stew meat or ground beef/hamburger. Beef cheeks typically need to be slow-cooked or braised. Beef cheeks can be cooked whole or cut into equal-size pieces. Beef cheeks "tend to fall apart" which limits plate presentation options for chefs. Stewed dishes that benefit from beef cheeks include pot-au-feu, and chili con carne. Beef cheeks were historically used in bologna and mettwurst sausage. Beef cheeks can also be incorporated into head cheese.

The United Kingdom prohibited the sale of beef cheeks in the wake of the bovine spongiform encephalopathy outbreaks in the 1980s and 1990s. Beef cheeks remain on the market in the United States.

== See also ==
- Tongue as food
- Head as food
- Masseter muscle
- List of beef dishes
- List of veal dishes

== Sources ==
- Fearnley-Whittingstall, Hugh (2007). The River Cottage Meat Book (1st US ed.). Berkeley, California: Ten Speed Press. ISBN 978-1-58008-843-5. LCCN 2006037842.
- McLagan, Jennifer (2011). Odd bits: how to cook the rest of the animal. Berkeley: Ten Speed Press. ISBN 978-1-58008-334-8.
