= Black pig =

Black pig or Black Pig may refer to:

- Berkshire pig, a breed of pig native to England known as kurobuta ("black pig") in Japanese
- Black Iberian pig, a breed of pig native to the Iberian Peninsula
- Large Black pig, a breed of pig native to England
- The Black Pig, or Il Maiale Nero, by Umberto Notari

== See also ==
- Black Pig's Dyke, in Ireland
