= La Cucina Italiana =

Italian cookbook first published in 1929

- Cover of November 2024, 95th anniversary issue
- Categories: Food and Entertainment
- Frequency: 12 issues per year
- Founded: December 15, 1929
- Company: Condé Nast Publications
- Country: Italy
- Based in: Milan
- Language: Italian, English
- Website: lacucinaitaliana.it and lacucinaitaliana.com

La Cucina Italiana (stylized in all caps) is an Italian monthly magazine focused on gastronomy and food culture.

== History ==
First published in Milan, Italy, on 15 December 1929 on the initiative of the journalist and literary man Umberto Notari, at the suggestion of his wife Delia Pavoni, who directed it until her death in 1935, the magazine was first created with the purpose of enhancing and promoting the traditional recipes of the Italian culinary art, as explained by the official name of the magazine. At the same time, dietary changes in the popular diet are also encouraged by proposing innovative and cheap culinary solutions, in line with the historical reference period. In each issue of the monthly magazine appear dozens of recipes, proposals for the table, old and new rules of etiquette, all embellished by personal recipes of artists and writers "dressed" with stories and poems.

La Cucina Italiana interrupted its publications in 1943, but returned to newsstands in 1952 published by the Gosetti sisters (Guglielmina, Anna, and Fernanda) and in 1986 was bought by Editrice Quadratum. The director since January 1981 was Paola Ricas who, since 2001, added to the magazine the monographic publications "Speciali de la Cucina Italiana" and, since November 2002, brought "La Cucina Italiana" brand to bookshops with volumes and cookbooks published by Edizioni Piemme. In February 2006, Patrizia Caglioni took over the direction of the magazine, replaced by Paolo Cavaglione in 2011 and by Paolo Paci in 2012; in the same year Anna Prandoni became brand director, and then took over the management of the magazine in March 2013.

The magazine website was already online in 1997. In July 2007, Quadratum Publishing USA, based in New York, produced and distributed La Cucina Italiana in English language for the American and Canadian markets. The American edition is added to those already existing in Flemish, German, Czech, and Turkish.

In 2014 La Cucina Italiana was acquired by the American publishing house Condé Nast. In the first two-year period 2014–2015 it was directed by Ettore Mocchetti, followed in 2016–2017 by Maria Vittoria Dalla Cia. The current director of the magazine, from June 2017, is Maddalena Fossati Dondero.
