= Pancetta =

Italian bacon made of pork belly meat

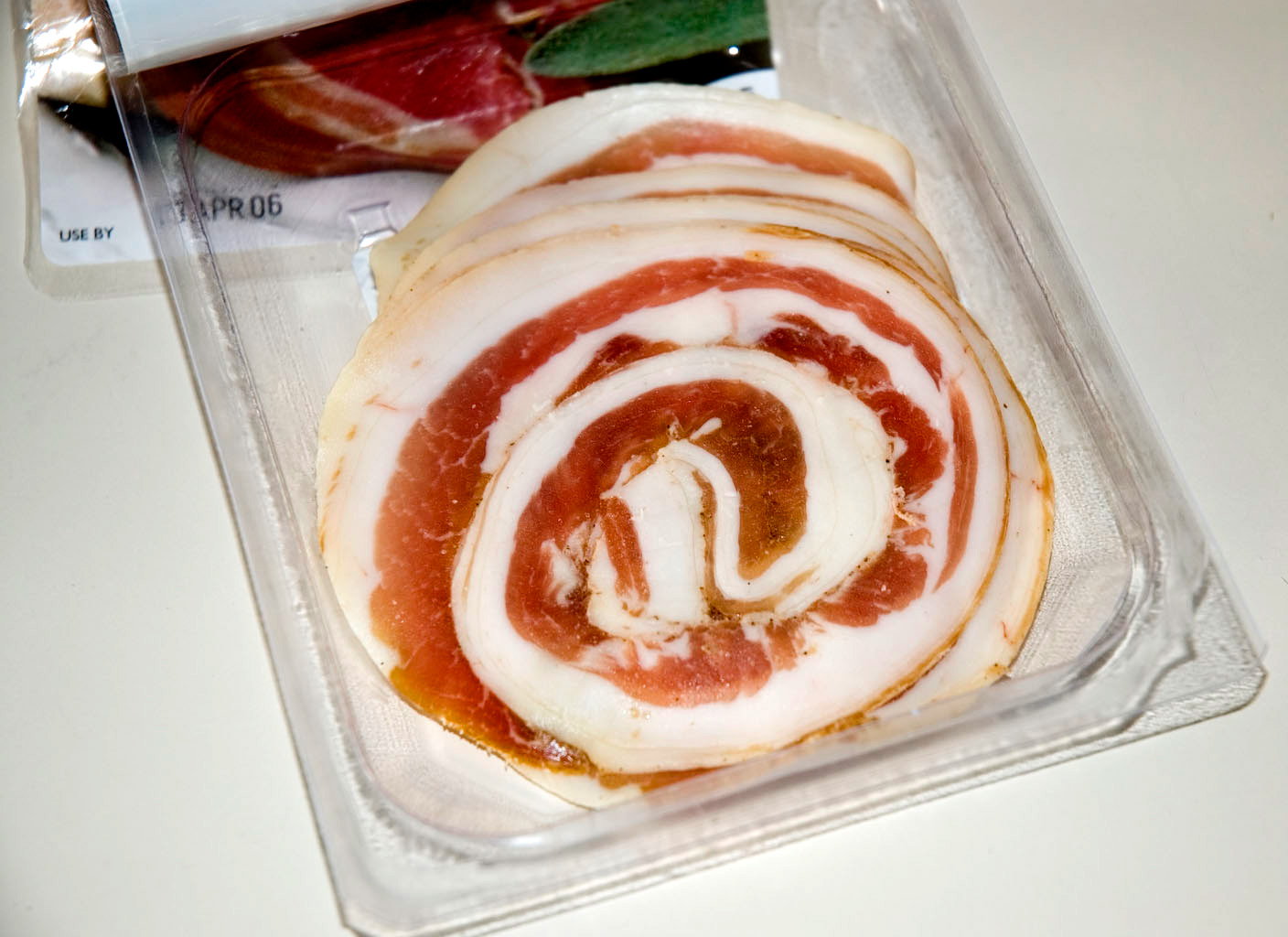
- Pancetta arrotolata slices
- Place of origin: Italy
- Main ingredients: Pork belly
- Ingredients generally used: Salt, sugar, spices

Pancetta (Italian: [panˈtʃetta]) is a salt-cured pork belly meat product in a category known as salume. In Italy, cubed pancetta (pancetta a cubetti or cubetti di pancetta) is often used to add depth to pasta.

== Uses ==
For cooking, pancetta is often cut into cubes (pancetta a cubetti or cubetti di pancetta). In Italy, it is commonly served as thinly sliced cold cuts. It can also be used in carbonara, although guanciale is generally regarded as more traditional. By the end of the 20th century in southern Italy, pancetta had become the most popular pork fat product, overtaking diced lard, which was increasingly considered unacceptably unhealthy.

== Types ==
The rolled type is typical of northern Italy, while the flattened type is typical of central and southern Italy.

While most pancetta is salt-cured and dried, pancetta affumicata ('smoked pancetta') is salt-cured and smoked, similar to bacon.

== Ingredients ==
Most pancetta products are made using pork belly brined in a mixture of salt, dextrose, spices and spice extracts, sodium erythorbate, garlic, sugar, sodium nitrate, and/or sodium nitrite.

== Production process ==
The pork belly skin is removed before the pork is salted and held in a tub of brine for 10–14 days in a low-temperature and high-humidity environment. The brine is usually composed of salt, nitrite, ascorbate, spices such as black pepper, chilli, garlic, juniper, and rosemary, and sometimes nitrate.

After salting and brining, the pork is rolled, with layers of fat on the outside surrounding a meaty core. The rolled pork is then tightly packed into nettings or other fibrous casings. Rolling produces the pancetta's distinctive shape, while the casing prevents case hardening in the latter stages of the production process.

Following rolling and packing, the pork undergoes enzymatic reactions facilitated by exposure to a warm environment of 22–24 °C for 24 to 36 hours. It is simultaneously exposed to cold smokes for desirable colours and flavours and to prevent moulding.

Finally, the smoked pork is held at 12–14 °C and 72–75% relative humidity for 3–4 weeks for drying. The resulting pancetta retains approximately 70% of its original weight.

== Preservation and shelf life ==
Pancetta is preserved by curing. Curing is done using a spice and salt mixture containing nitrates or nitrites, which act to extend the shelf life of cured meats. Nitrates help remove excess moisture from the pork, decreasing water activity and limiting available free water for the growth of spoilage-causing and pathogenic microorganisms. Sodium nitrites are used to prevent the growth of botulism-causing bacteria and listeria monocytogenes, as well as imparting desirable flavour and colour. Nitrates are said to act like time-released nitrites and are used in pancetta products that require longer periods of curing and drying.

Pancetta kept in its original packaging can be stored for up to 12 months. After opening, it has a shelf life of around 2–3 weeks in the refrigerator and up to 3 months in the freezer.

== Nutritional value ==
One 30-g serving of pancetta contains around 5.0 g of protein, 11.0 g of fat, and 20–25 mg of cholesterol. One serving comprises between 15 and 22 percent of the accepted daily value of fats. Despite its high portion of daily fat value, pancetta has a lower fat content than other bacon products.

A single serving of pancetta contains around 540 mg of sodium. Consumption of processed meats is reported to be the second largest source of dietary sodium consumption, with bacon products leading processed pork products in sodium content.

== Regulations ==
In the European Union, the labelling of pancetta is regulated under the protected designation of origin (PDO) status. Only pancetta produced in the Italian region of Calabria may be labelled as pancetta di Calabria.

In the United States, under the Food Safety and Inspection Service of the USDA, hormones are not allowed in hogs or poultry raised for food. Pork or poultry sold in the US must be labelled as hormone-free and include a statement saying that federal regulations prohibit the use of hormones.

Under Canadian regulations (C.R.C., Annex C.2), a cured meat product such as pancetta is an edible meat product prepared with salt with at least 100 ppm of sodium nitrite or potassium nitrate.

== See also ==
Media related to Pancetta at Wikimedia Commons

- List of dried foods
- Bacon
