= Roberto Serrini =

American director

Roberto Serrini is an American director, editor and travel writer based in Los Angeles and New York City. He directs commercials and branded documentaries, and has made food and motorcycle documentaries including Italy in Bocca (2020) and Disco Sauce: The Unbelievable True Story of Penne Alla Vodka (2022).

== Early life and education ==
Serrini was born in Queens, New York, to Italian immigrant parents. He studied film theory at the University of California, Santa Barbara.

== Career ==
=== Editing ===
Serrini began his career as an editor in New York, where he was mentored by the editor Neil Gust. At the design studio thelab he was credited among the art directors on Comedy Central's "Comedymark" logo, which won a Silver Pencil at the 2011 One Show.

=== Commercials ===
In 2017 he joined the production company Derby Content as a director, and SHOOT magazine included him in its 2017 New Directors Showcase for his short film Unattended Baggage. He later joined the roster of Superlounge. He directed and edited Nike's Tech Pack campaign, which featured athletes including LeBron James, Cristiano Ronaldo and Maria Sharapova. For the agency Dailey he directed "What Lies Beyond", a five-film campaign for the 2018 relaunch of the Honda Gold Wing motorcycle. For BMW Motorrad's centenary he directed and edited Storied, a three-part documentary series; its feature-length cut, The Rider, was released in 2024.

=== Motorcycle documentaries ===
Moto Borgotaro (2015), a profile of a Brooklyn motorcycle mechanic, was described by No Film School as "Tarantino-esque". His other motorcycle films include The American Wall of Death (2017) and EARNED (2021), about a collector's Ducati 750 Super Sport.

=== Food documentaries ===
In March 2020, on the eve of New York's COVID-19 lockdown, Serrini and his childhood friend Peter Boggia cooked from In Bocca, a rare 1970s series of regional Italian cookbooks, and filmed it as Italy in Bocca. The film won Best Short Film or Documentary at the 12th TASTE Awards. His documentary Disco Sauce traces the history of penne alla vodka. It has been cited in Esquire Italia, Corriere della Sera, Gambero Rosso and Epicurious, and won the TASTE Awards' first Bob Saget Award for Best Comedy or Humor in 2023. In 2023 Deadline reported that Picture Farm was developing The Secret Ingredient, a series based on the film. Earlier, HuffPost featured his short food videos, including Make Me a Sandwich.

=== Travel films and writing ===
Serrini is a writer and Editor at Large for Get Lost Travel Magazine. For the polar cruise line Quark Expeditions he made Walking With Shackleton, shot in Antarctica, and Reaching Unreachable, shot in the Arctic. Walking With Shackleton won a Gold Magellan Award from Travel Weekly in 2024, and both films won Gold at the International Tourism Film Festival Africa (2025 and 2023). His series Tasting Italy with Roberto Serrini, made for Tuscanini, won two TASTE Awards in 2025. While he was filming in Modena in July 2023, his camera equipment was stolen from a parked car; the theft was covered by the Italian press. Serrini was a finalist at the IPW 2022 Travel Writer Awards, and The New York Times has quoted him on the history of carbonara.

== Recognition ==
Year	Award	Category	Work
2017	Los Angeles Independent Film Festival Awards (February)	Best Spec Commercial	"The Pitch" (Cannondale)
2021	TASTE Awards	Best Short Film or Documentary (10–40 minutes)	Italy in Bocca
2021	TASTE Awards	Best Mini Film or Documentary; Best Food Travel Series, Online and Streaming	Sobrino de Botín
2023	TASTE Awards	Bob Saget Award for Best Comedy or Humor	Disco Sauce
2025	TASTE Awards	Best New Series; Best Branded Program, Native Content, Video, or Advertisement	Tasting Italy with Roberto Serrini
