= Principle of typicality =

General legal principle

The principle of typicality (from the Greek term typikos which means model) is a general legal principle that takes on different meanings in contexts.

== Criminal law ==
In criminal law, the principle of typicality, also defined as the prohibition of analogy, indicates that the criminal law applies only to real events that actually relate to the abstract case, without having recourse to the principle of analogy.

The principle of typicality provides that for each crime the essential elements must be defined, which will make up the abstract case; and consequently the negative value necessary to identify, through the principle of proportionality, the appropriate penalty.

== Commercial law ==
In commercial law, the principle of typicality indicates that real rights are predetermined by the law in a certain number of figures, for this reason called typical, which cannot be further increased on the basis of the will of private individuals.

== Administrative law ==
In administrative law, the principle of typicality indicates that administrative acts are to be considered a numerus clausus (closed number) and precisely for this reason they are identified only with those provided for by law by the Italian administrative system.
