= Pork jowl =

Cut of pork from a pig's cheek

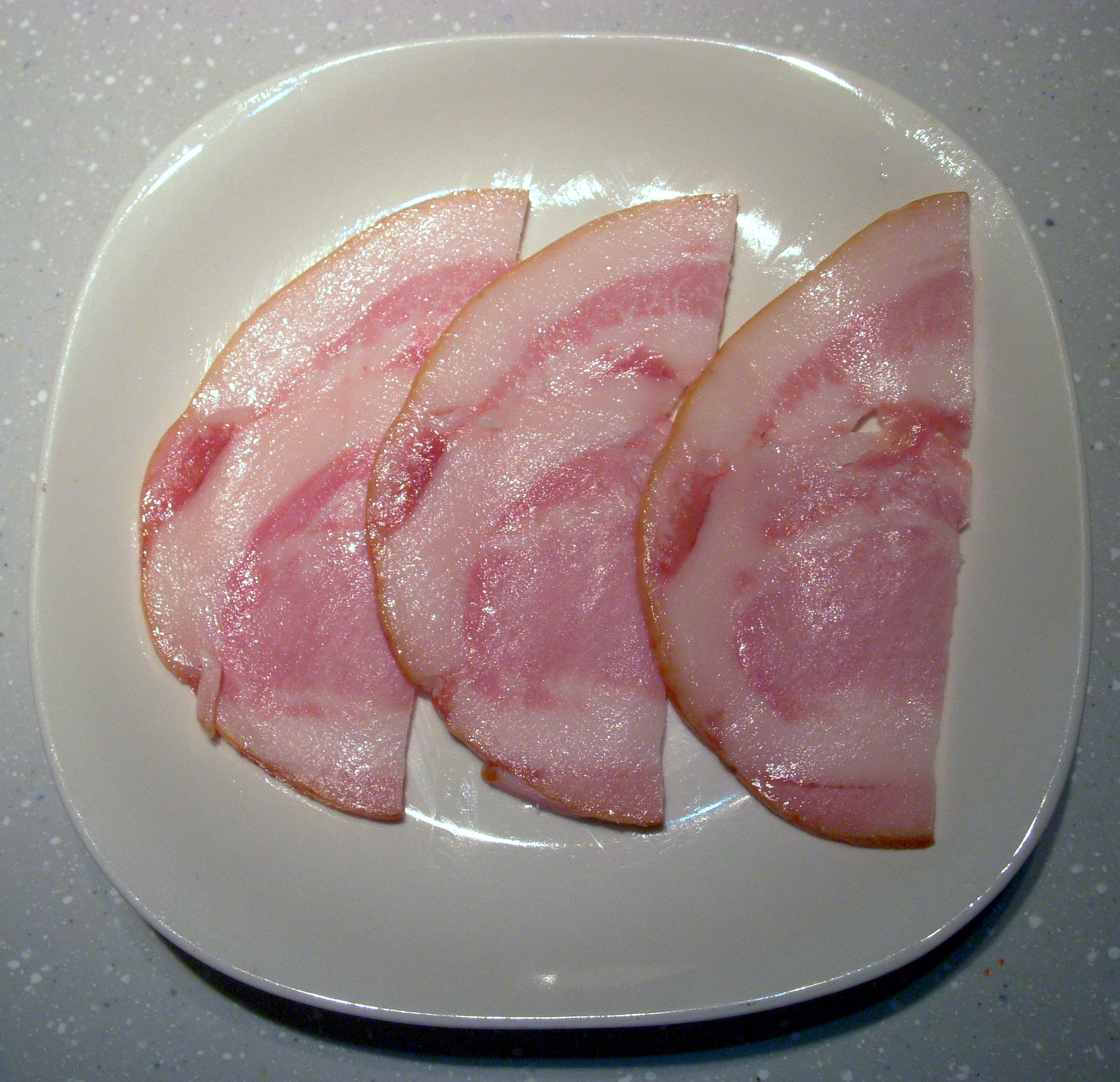
Sliced jowl bacon

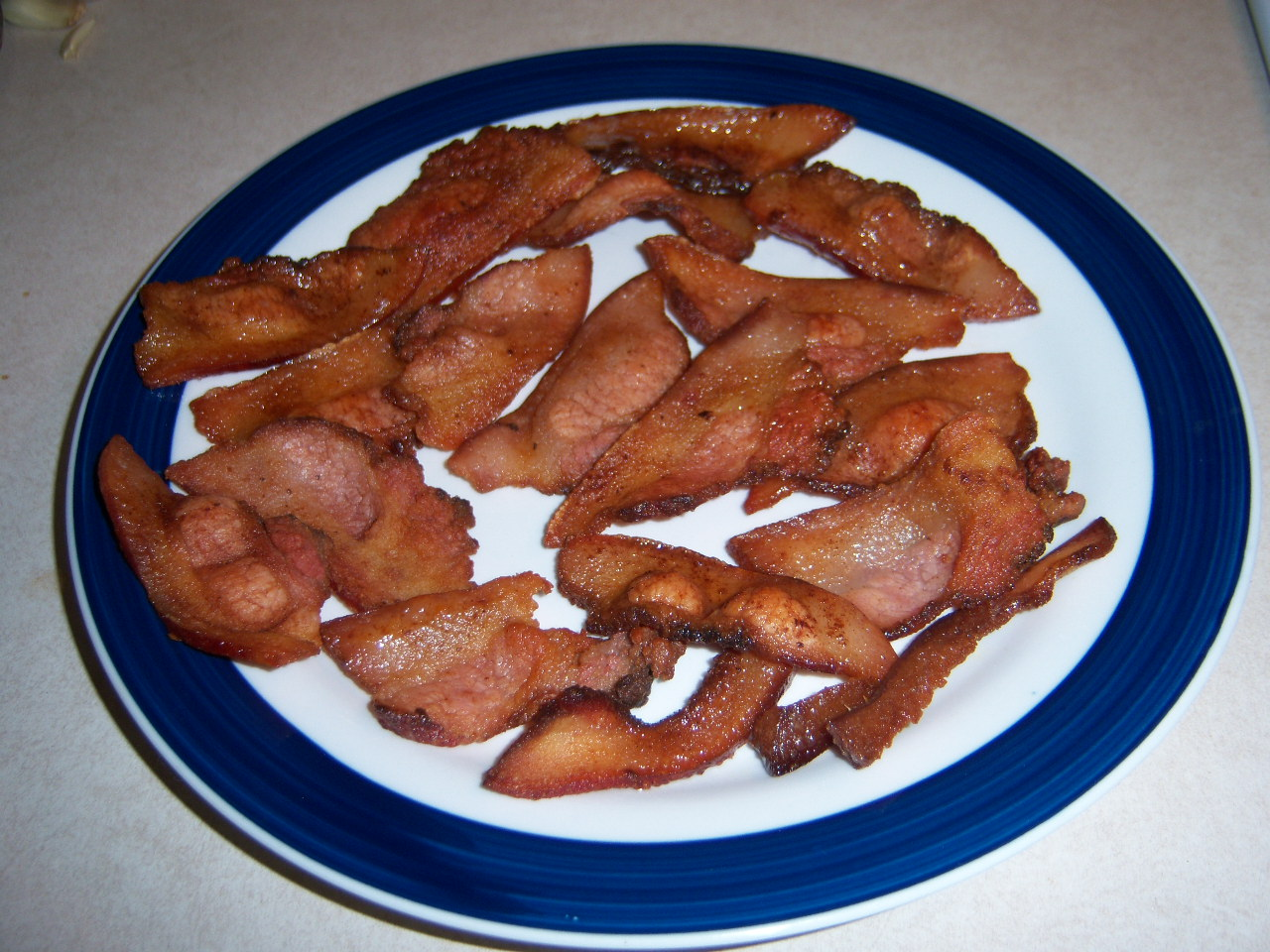
Fried pork jowl

Pork jowl is a cut of pork from a pig's cheek. Different food traditions have used it as a fresh cut or as a cured pork product (with smoke and/or curing salt). As a cured and smoked meat in America, it is called jowl bacon or, especially in the Southern United States, hog jowl, joe bacon, or joe meat. In the US, hog jowl is a staple of soul food. Outside the United States, there is a longer culinary tradition: the cured, non-smoked Italian variant is called guanciale.

== Culinary ==
Jowl bacon can be fried and eaten as a main course, similar to streaky bacon. Often, it is used as a seasoning for beans, black-eyed peas or cooked with leafy green vegetables such as collard greens or turnip greens in a traditional Southeastern meal.

Jowl meat may also be chopped and used as a garnish, similar to bacon bits, or served in sandwich form. Pork jowl can be used as a binding ingredient in pork liver sausages, such as liverwurst and braunschweiger.

== Traditions in the US ==
A Southern US tradition of eating black-eyed peas and greens with either pork jowls or fatback on New Year's Day to ensure prosperity throughout the new year goes back hundreds of years. During the American Civil War (1861 to 1865), the peas were thought to represent wealth to the Southerners, while the Northern army considered the food to be fit as livestock feed only. Pigs (and by extension, pork products) were symbolic of "wealth and gluttony" and consuming jowls or fatback on New Year's Day guaranteed a good new year.

== Storage ==
Because pork jowl can be cured, like many other cuts of pork, it has been a traditional wintertime food as it is able to be stored for long periods of time without refrigeration.

== See also ==
- List of bacon dishes
- List of smoked foods
- Beef cheeks
