= Pasquale Cozzolino =

Italian Chef

- Born: 1977 (age 48–49); Naples, Italy
- Known for: The pizza diet
- Culinary career
- Cooking style: Neapolitan cuisine
- Current restaurant
- Ribalta, New York City

Pasquale Cozzolino (born 1977) is a Neapolitan chef based in New York, specialized in Neapolitan cuisine.

== Early life ==
Cozzolino was born in Naples. He started learning cooking at the age of 15. He studied at Ippolito Cavalcanti College in Naples, and he was a student of Gaetano Esposito, the great-grandnephew of the inventor of the Neapolitan Margherita Pizza.

== Career ==
He moved to New York in 2011, where he is the owner and chef of a Neapolitan cuisine restaurant.

Cozzolino has been the chef for New York City Mayor Bill De Blasio since 2018, and a private chef for U2, Madonna, Muse, Coldplay, Eros Ramazzotti, and Laura Pausini.

He created a diet with pizza, which he experimented on himself. In 2012 he began a diet where he ate a margherita pizza cooked according to the method of Neapolitan cuisine every day for lunch, losing 96 pounds in nine months. The concept of the diet is based on the long fermentation period of the yeast (more than 36 hours), which removes almost all the sugars from the dough.

He also worked as advisor for a project managed by BeeHex, a startup founded by NASA, to produce pizza with 3D printers. The goal of this technology is to duplicate the original recipe of Neapolitan pizza exactly.
