= Guanciale =

Italian cured meat product

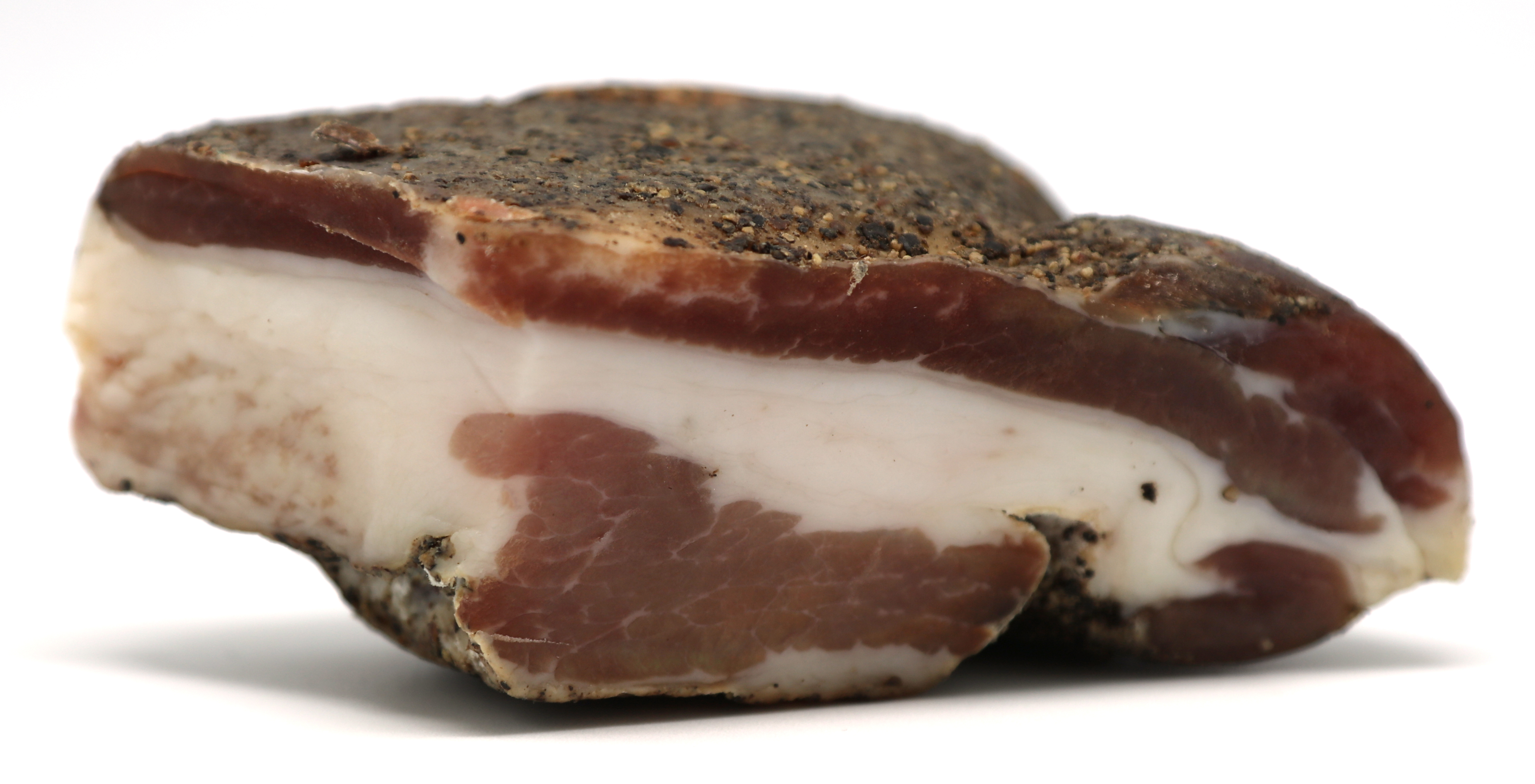
- Place of origin: Italy
- Main ingredients: Pork jowl or cheeks
- Ingredients generally used: Salt, sugar, spices

Guanciale (Italian: [ɡwanˈtʃaːle]) is an Italian salt-cured meat product prepared from pork jowl or cheeks. Its name is derived from guancia, meaning 'cheek'. Its rendered fat gives flavour to and thickens the sauce of pasta dishes.

== Production ==
Guanciale is usually rubbed with just salt and ground black pepper by cooks in Rome, but some producers use other spices, herbs, peperoncino or red pepper, and sometimes garlic. After a few weeks of this initial brining process, salt is washed off with wine. Then, it is spiced once again with pepper or chili powder and air-cured for weeks to months until it loses approximately 30% of its original weight. Its flavour is stronger than that of other pork products, such as pancetta, and its texture is more delicate. When cooked, the fat typically melts away.

== In cuisine ==
Guanciale may be cut and eaten directly in small portions, but is often used as an ingredient in pasta dishes such as spaghetti alla carbonara and sauces such as sugo all'amatriciana.

It is a specialty of central Italy, particularly Umbria and Lazio. Pancetta, a cured Italian bacon, is sometimes used as a substitute when guanciale is not available.

== See also ==
Media related to Guanciale at Wikimedia Commons

- Carbonara
