= Umberto Notari =

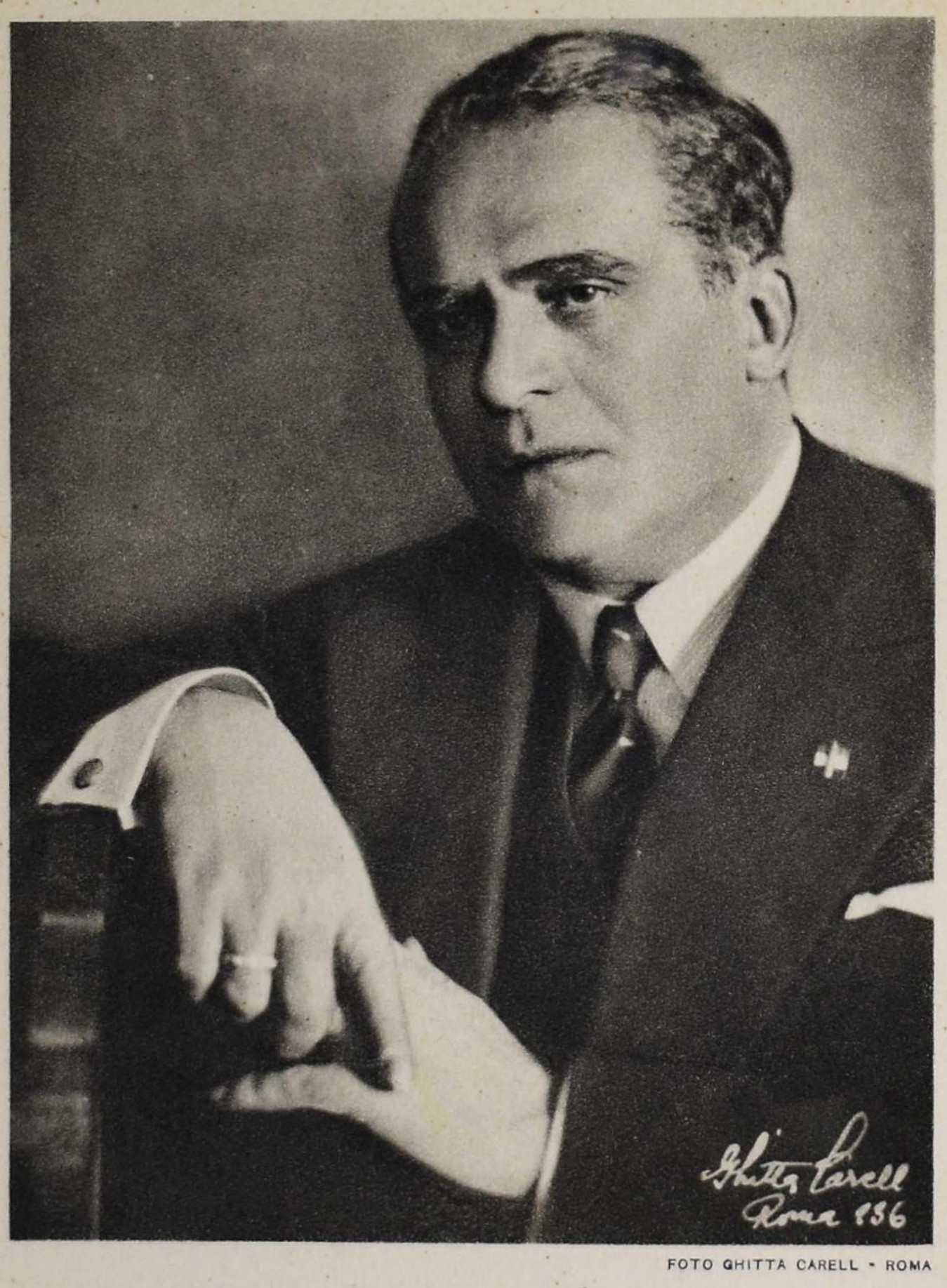
- Born: 1878; Bologna, Italy
- Died: 1950; Perledo, Italy
- Occupation: Journalist; writer; editor

Umberto Notari (1878–1950) was an Italian journalist, writer, and editor.

== Bibliography ==
- Quelle signore (Scene di una grande città moderna) - Milan 1904
- Femmina (Scene di una grande capitale) - Milan 1906
- I tre ladri (Mio zio miliardario) - Koschitz, Milan 1907
- Dio contro Dio (Il maiale nero): documenti e rivelazioni - Milan 1908
- Con la mano sinistra - Lettere aperte a Vittorio Emanuele III - Milan 1908
- Noi - Etica e dinamica dell'Associazione Italiana di Avanguardia - Milan 1910
- Fufù (Un terrorista) - Milan 1910
- L'ubriaco (commedia in tre atti) - Milan 1915
- La prima sassata (commedia sarcastica) - Milan 1920
- Bàsia, ovvero le ragazze allarmanti - Milan 1928
- La fatica nuziale - Milan 1928
- Il turbante violetto - Milan 1928
- Vita dei rosicanti (I celibatari) - Milan 1928
- Signora "900" - Milan 1929
- La donna "tipo tre" - Milan 1929 (riediz. 1998)
- Il podestà dagli occhi aperti - Milan 1930
- Le due monete - Milan 1930
- Meridiano di Roma - Milan 1930
- L'elixir di lunga Italia - Milan 1930
- Il giocatore di bridge - Milan 1931
- Luce dal sud - Milan 1931
- Il coltello in bocca - Milan 1932
- L'arte di bere - Milan 1933
- I leoni e le formiche - Milan 1933
- Dichiarazioni alle più belle donne del mondo - Bompiani, Milan 1933
- L'arte di fumare - Milan 1934
- I pifferi di Ginevra - Milan 1936
- Il signor Geremia - Milan 1936
- Vieni in Italia con me - Milan 1937
- Autarchia contro xenolatria. A che gioco giochiamo? - Milan 1938
- Panegirico della razza italiana - Milan 1939

== Literary references ==
"'Did you ever read a copy of the 'Black Pig'?' asked the lieutenant. 'I will get you a copy. It was that which shook my faith.'

'It is a filthy and vile book,' said the priest. 'You do not really like it.'

'It is very valuable,' said the lieutenant. 'It tells you about those priests. You will like it, he said to me. I smiled at the priest and he smiled back across the candle light. 'Don't you read it,' he said."

— Hemingway, Ernest. A Farewell to Arms. New York: Scribner, 2003. Pages 7-8.

Notari's work "Il Maiale Nero" ('The Black Pig') is discussed in the classic American novel A Farewell to Arms.

== See also ==
- A Farewell to Arms
