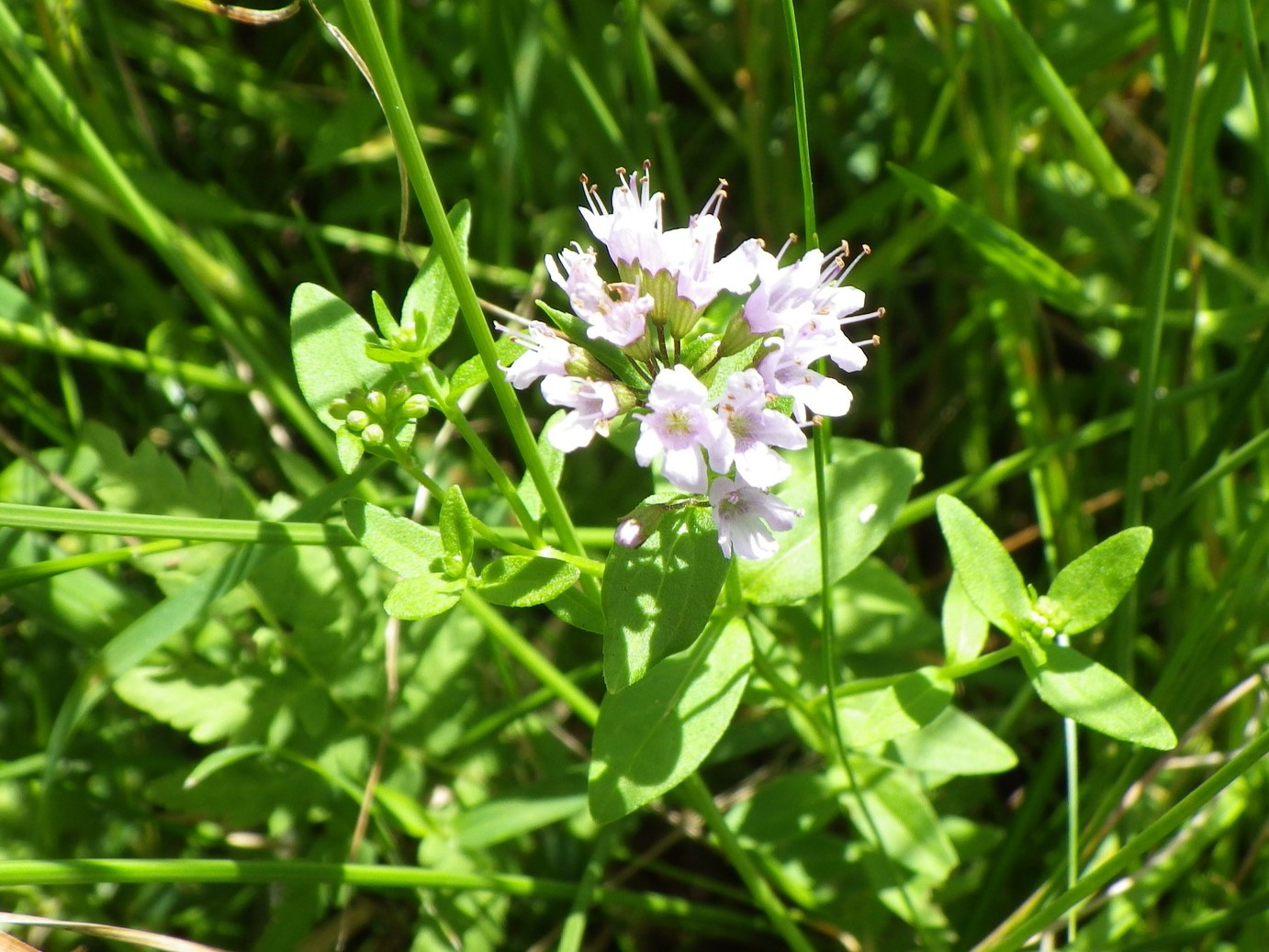

Scientific classification
- Kingdom: Plantae
- Clade: Tracheophytes
- Clade: Angiosperms
- Clade: Eudicots
- Clade: Asterids
- Order: Lamiales
- Family: Lamiaceae
- Genus: Mentha
- Species: M. japonica

Binomial name
- Mentha japonica Makino

Synonyms
- Micromeria japonica Miq.; Micromeria yezoensis Miyabe & Tatew.; Satureia japonica Miq.

= Mentha japonica =

Species of mint

Mentha japonica is a species of plant in the family Lamiaceae, endemic to the islands of Hokkaido and Honshu, Japan. Initially described as Micromeria japonica by Friedrich Anton Wilhelm Miquel, it was first identified under its present name by Japanese botanist Tomitaro Makino in 1906. A relatively rare plant, it is classified by the Japanese Ministry of Environment as a Near Threatened species.

== Name ==
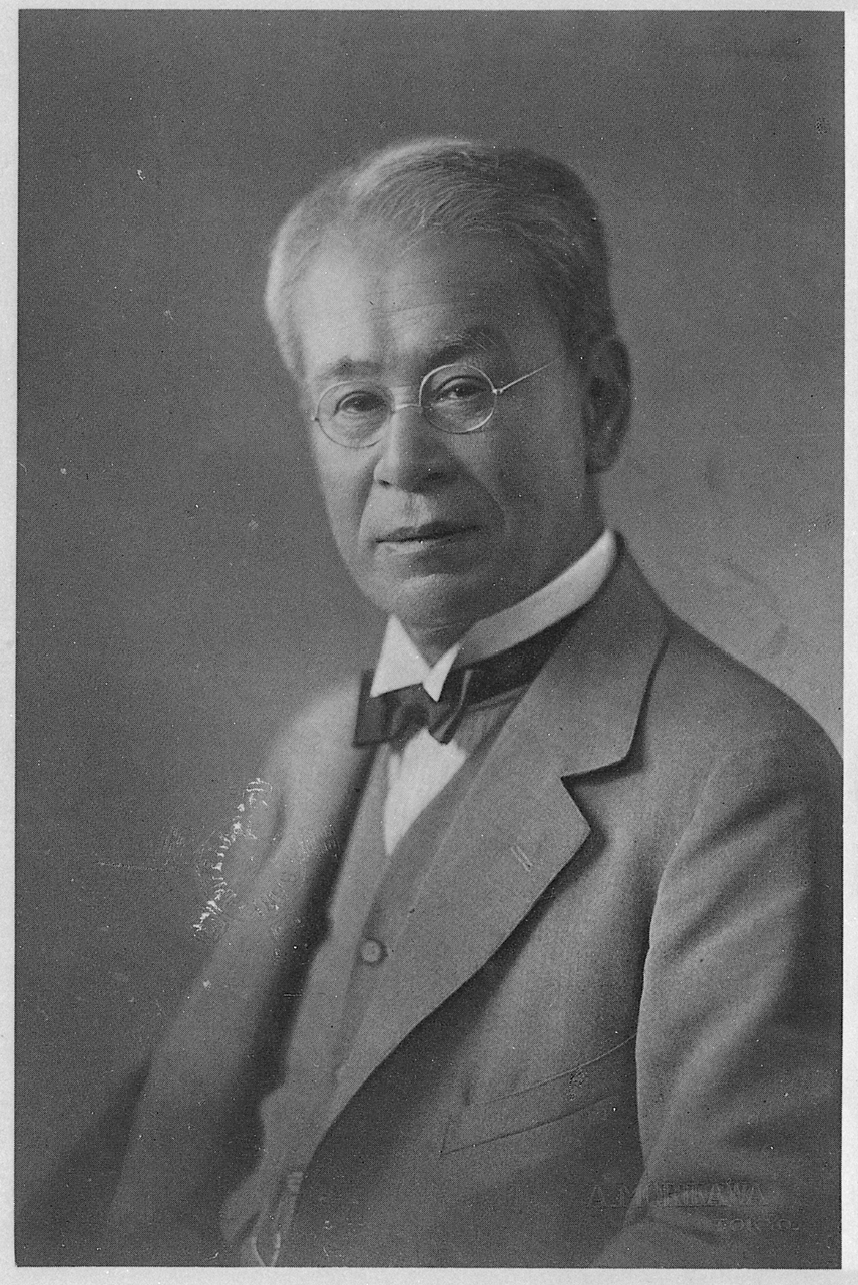
Mentha japonica was first described by Japanese botanist Tomitaro Makino

Mentha japonica's botanical name is derived from its country of origin, Japan. One of its Japanese-language vernacular name is said to derive from the plant's small size compared to other mint species. In the Japanese literary system of hanakotoba, M. japonica is used as a metaphor for virtue.

== Taxonomy ==
Mentha japonica is now generally accepted as a distinct species by taxonomic authorities, but (as with mints generally) the exact phylogenetic tree of Mentha japonica has been difficult to determine due to the genus' tendency to hybridize readily. The species was not included among some 19th or 20th-century academic classifications of the genus Mentha. Where it was included, authors have differed on which members of Mentha it is most similar to, and therefore which section of Mentha to classify it within. For example, a 1971 paper placed it with Mentha arvensis within the subgenus Menthastrum sect. Verticillatae, on the basis of the presence of flower spikes in the axils of leaves. Conversely, a 2002 author placed it within the section Eriodontes, along with Mentha australis, Mentha diemenica, Mentha satureioides and Mentha cunninghamii. However a more recent 2006 survey placed it within the section Mentha, along with seven other species including Mentha spicata & Mentha canadensis. A 2018 phylogenetic study disputed the placement with Mentha, finding it was not closely related to the other mints within the section. These same researchers found a close genetic similarity to Mentha gattefossei, because of which they re-proposed the classification of M. japonica within section Eridontes. It has also been placed with section Capitatae, along with Mentha aquatica and Mentha dahurica.

Mentha japonica may be categorized as among the mints with menthol as a primary monoterpene compound (as opposed to carvone or linalool), a characteristic it shares with the majority of the genus.

Genetically, along with M. gattefossei and Mentha pulegium, it has a base chromosome number of x = 10. It is generally reported to have a somatic chromosome count of 2n = 48. It is thought to be either tetraploid or pentaploid.

Viable laboratory hybridization has been documented between M. japonica and the Mentha species M. canadensis, M. aquatica, M. rotundifolia, M. spicata & M. arvensis. A possibility of hybridization with M. dahurica has also been predicted based upon phylogram similarity.

== Description ==
Mentha japonica is a perennial plant which grows to a height of 20-40 centimeters. It spreads and reproduces clonally via thin rhizomes. Its leaves are oblong with entire margins, and its flowers vary from white to pale violet. It has an odor similar to pennyroyal (m. pulegium).

The essential oil components of M. japonica appear to be variable. One 1970 survey found the primary constituents to be menthone (50.8%), isomenthone (18.6%) and pulegone (12.6%). Other chemical constituents identified in smaller amounts include 3-Octanone, 3-Octonal, d-Limonene, alpha-Pinene, beta-Pinene, Menthyl acetate and Piperitone. These numbers were broadly confirmed by a follow-up survey, but an analysis shortly after (1978) found a significantly higher pulegone content (50%) and lower menthone content (27.9%). A study of wild plants in Hokkaido recorded pulegone content as high as 64.3 to 68%, while experimentally-grown plants in Fukushima Prefecture yielded only between 24.8 and 33.9% depending on soil conditions.

At least one named variation exists, a long stem variety, form. prostrata Sugimoto. This variant grows its stem more than one meter and tends to fall to the ground.

== Distribution ==
Mentha japonica is endemic to the islands of Hokkaido and Honshu within its native range. It occupies lowland & mountain wetlands, and blooms from August to October in Japan.

It is considered a rare plant in its native distribution. According to the Threatened Wildlife of Japan Red Data Book, published by Japan's Ministry of Environment, Mentha japonica is classified as Near Threatened. This is an upgrade from its 2004 classification, which had listed it as Vulnerable. Documented there in the 1940s and 1950s, it is now considered extinct within Aichi Prefecture, due to loss of its preferred habitat.

== Use ==
Like other mints, Mentha japonica is used as both an aromatic herb and as a traditional remedy. Topical ointments containing M. japonica have also been used to treat mastitis in cows.
