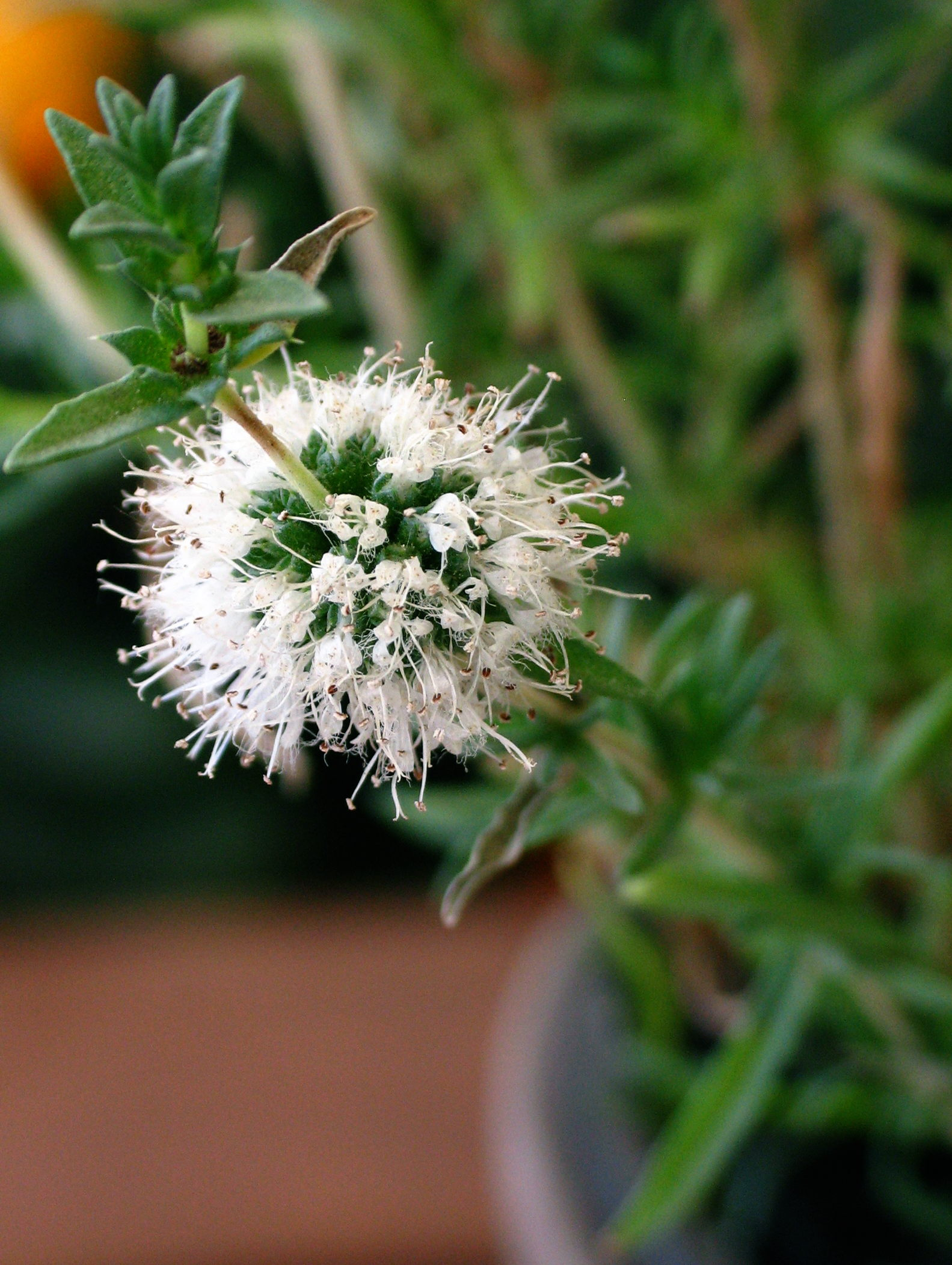

Conservation status
- Near Threatened (IUCN 3.1)

Scientific classification
- Kingdom: Plantae
- Clade: Tracheophytes
- Clade: Angiosperms
- Clade: Eudicots
- Clade: Asterids
- Order: Lamiales
- Family: Lamiaceae
- Genus: Mentha
- Species: M. cervina

Binomial name
- Mentha cervina L.

Synonyms
- Mentha punctata Moench; Mentha multifida Stokes; Preslia glabriflora Opiz; Preslia villiflora Opiz; Preslia cervina (L.) Fresen.; Preslia cervina subvar. glabriflora (Opiz) Nyman; Preslia cervina subvar. villiflora (Opiz) Nyman; Pulegium angustifolium Riv.; Pulegium cervinum (L.) Mill.

= Mentha cervina =

Species of mint

Mentha cervina, commonly known as hart's pennyroyal, is a perennial herbaceous plant of the Mentha (mint) genus. It is native to the western Mediterranean Sea region, growing naturally from southwestern France to the Iberian Peninsula, and south to Azores, Morocco and Algeria. Its common name reflects a traditional association with the separate species Mentha pulegium or pennyroyal. The plants were associated due to their shared high pulegone content, which gives them both a distinctive, strong aroma.

A sprawling herb growing up to 30 cm tall, Mentha cervina has been used both whole and as its essential oil in a variety of culinary and traditional medical contexts. More recently, research has examined its constituent chemicals' potential antioxidant, antibacterial and antifungal abilities.

Due to overall declines in its population and localized extinctions, Mentha cervina has been assessed as a Near Threatened species on the IUCN Red List.

== Name ==
Carl Linnaeus gave the species the botanical name epithet cervina from the Latin meaning 'of or pertaining to deer.' This may be referring to a preference for deer to eat it. The meaning of this name was calqued into several European languages. In 18th-century German texts, the name Hirschpolen was used - Hirsch being German for 'deer' and Polen a German common name for Mentha pulegium (pennyroyal). Johann Georg Krünitz in 1804 recorded the name Hirsch Munze, 'deer mint.' Likewise, Lamarck, writing in 1815, reported a French common name Menthe de cerfs or 'deer mint.' In English, Mentha cervina is similarly referred to as 'hart's pennyroyal,' 'hart' being an archaic term for a stag.

Other common names have been recorded. In 1789 John Graeffer used the name "narrow-leaved pennyroyal." An 1884 dictionary of English language common names also recorded the names "hyssop-leaved Mint" and "stag mint." The name "water spearmint" has also been attested. In Portuguese, Mentha cervina also has a number of common names, including alecrim-do-rio ('river rosemary'), hortelã-crespa ('mint crisp') and hortelã-dos-campos ('field mint').

== Description ==
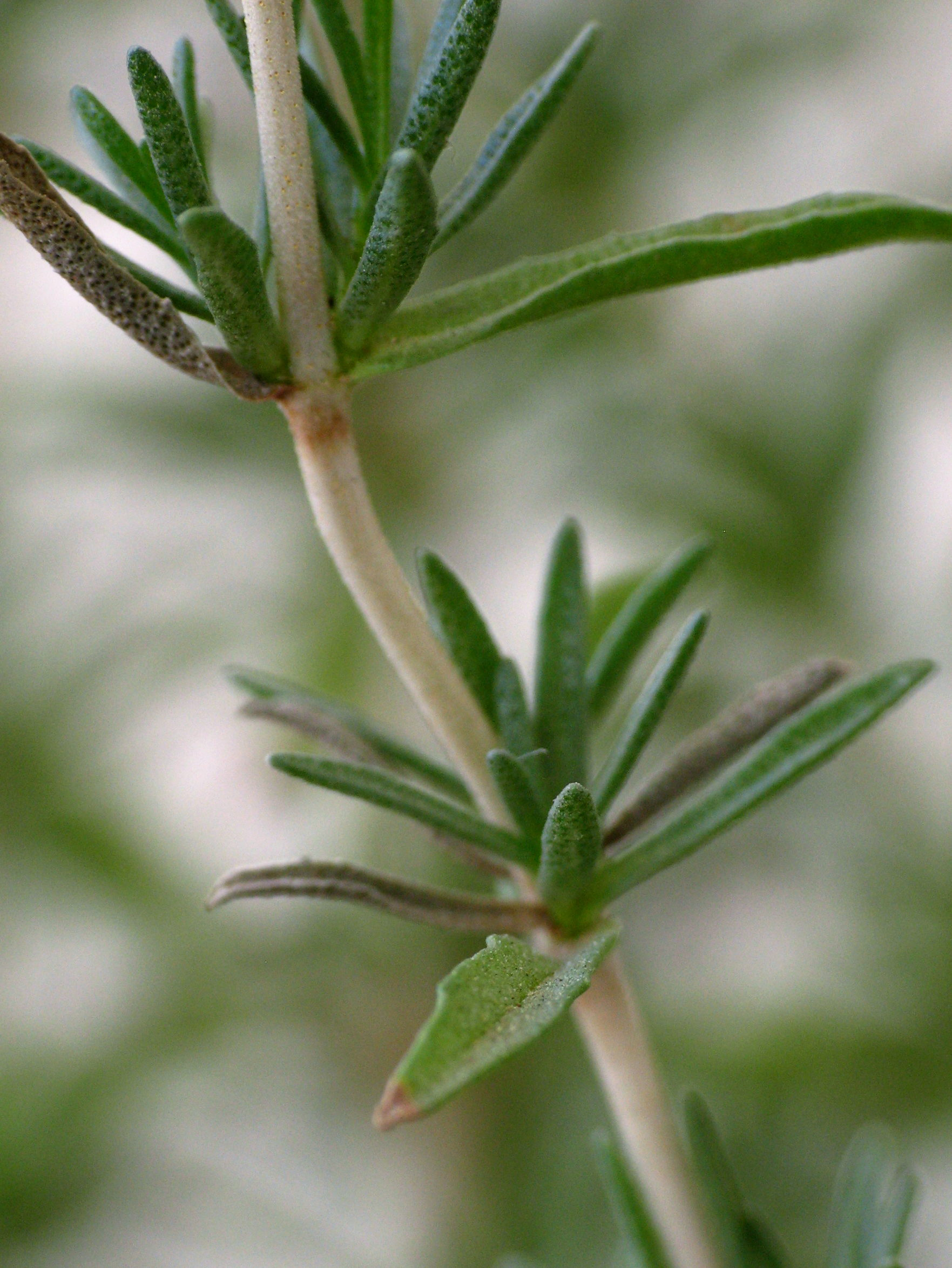
Detail of leaf morphology of Mentha cervina

Sources differ whether Mentha cervina grows from 30 centimeters tall or to as much as two feet tall. The plant has slender, lance-shaped aromatic leaves. Its bracts are palmate, with stamina longer than the corolla. It produces pale blue to lilac flowers in large, dense, many-flowered whorls. The plant produces few seeds, so most reproduction is done vegetatively by rhizome.

Mentha cervina can be distinguished from other species within the genus Mentha by several traits. Its bractales are digitately lobed, as distinct from other Mentha species which are simple. Whereas most Mentha species have five calyx lobes, Mentha cervina has only four. Most Mentha species have calyx lobes with an acute apex, but Mentha cervina has whitish apical spines on each lobe instead, a trait it shares only with Mentha gattefossei. Mentha cervina may also be distinguished by its fine and small leaves.

Phylogenetic studies have determined the plant to have diploid chromosomes. Two different surveys in the 1970s found that Mentha cervina had a gametic chromosome count of 2n = 36. Chambers & Hummer's analysis of the Mentha collection of the USDA concurred with this count. Tucker & Naczi's 2006 work on the other hand suggested a count of 2n = 26. Bunsawat's 2002 study found a genomic chromosome count of x = 12.

While Mentha species' essential oil composition often varies significantly within species, researchers have found especially homogenous chemical constituent chemotypes in populations within Portugal. Noting both species as major producers of pulegium, researchers also reported that biomass production of Mentha cervina was superior to that of the more widely cultivated Mentha pulegium.

== Taxonomy ==
Mentha is a genus with a complex taxonomy, with easy hybridization between its members, which makes the identification and classification of distinct species within it a difficult task. Mentha cervina is accepted as a valid, separate species by taxonomic authorities.

Linnaeus first described the species as Mentha cervina in 1753 in his Species Plantarum. But other early taxonomists often placed it outside of the genus Mentha. In 1768, Philip Miller placed it within the Pulegium genus (as Pulegium cervina), along with Mentha pulegium (pennyroyal). In 1824, Philipp Maximilian Opiz divided Mentha again, identifying a third genus, Preslia, based upon the calyx count, and within which he played M. cervina. Simultaneously, Opiz further separated M. cervina into two species: Preslia glabriflora Opiz and Preslia villiflora Opiz.

George Bentham, writing a complete taxonomy of the Labiatae family in 1848, placed it as the sole member of the genus Preslia, but in this case as a single species, and following the name assigned to it by botanist Georg Fresenius, Preslia cervina. Bentham noted its similarities to the species he placed within the Mentha and Pulegium genera, but agreed with Opiz's decision to separate it from them, based in part upon the number of calyx lobes present. In 1877, Louis Jules Ernest Malinvaud reversed the trend of isolating the species, placing it within a genus of his creation, Menthoides, along with Mentha pulegium and Mentha requienii. John Isaac Briquet however echoed Bentham and Opiz's classification of the species alone within the genus Preslia in his 1897 classification.

In contrast, 20th-century authors have generally returned to Linnaeus' original assignment of the species to the Mentha genus. Harley & Brighton, writing in 1977, maintained it within the Mentha genus, but assigned it to its own section, Preslia. These authors noted the many similarities between Mentha cervina & Mentha gattefossei and speculated about a possible relationship between them. Speculation about an ancestral connection of Mentha cervina to Mentha gattefossei had begun as early as 1922, with the work of French botanist René Maire, who first described the latter plant. Like previous authors however, Harley & Brighton cited the difference in calyx lobes as a significant distinguishing element.

Bunsawat's 2002 molecular phylogenetic study found "no support for placing M. cervina in a separate genus," and confirmed the close genetic relationship with Mentha gattefossei. Bunsawat et al.'s 2004 extension of this phylogenetic research, analyzing chloroplast DNA, confirmed a link with Mentha gattefossei, placing them in a sub-clade, citing three shared insertion and deletion mutations between the species, as well as morphological and ecological similarities.

In their 2006 survey, Tucker & Naczi disputed any close relation to Mentha pulegium asserted by earlier authors like Miller. Instead, they too located Mentha cervina within a "robust clade" with Mentha gattefossei, noting the many similarities between the two. In their overall taxonomy of Mentha, Tucker & Naczi placed Mentha cervina within the section Eriodontes on the basis of morphological features, chromosome count and essential oil composition. In addition to Mentha gattefossei, the other species within this section are Mentha australis, Mentha laxiflora and Mentha satureioides. Bunsawat et al. caution however, based on geographic distance (M. gattefossei and M. cervina are native to Mediterranean region, the rest are endemic to Australia) that this grouping may nevertheless be polyphyletic.

== Distribution ==
Mentha cervina's contemporary distribution is confined to the western Mediterranean Sea, in the countries of Portugal, Spain, Morocco, Algeria and six southwestern departments of France. It occupies a range of damp land to water (up to 60 cm deep), and overwinters underwater in its native habitat. It is recognized as a central component of the Menthion cervinae alliance. According to the International Union for Conservation of Nature, it is suffering "severe and rapid declines throughout its range" and is therefore assessed as a Near Threatened species on its IUCN Red List. Its risk is considered particularly high due to its limited original habitat range.

Its historical range within the Mediterranean was wider, extending to Italy and into Switzerland. Johann Trommsdorff reported wild Swiss populations in 1809. Antoine Gouan likewise mentioned its presence among the mountain lakes of Le Grammont, in the canton of Valais. François-Joseph Cazin described it previously as growing in the Provence region of France. Today, it is confined to only a few areas of that region, in the departments of Bouches-du-Rhône and Vaucluse. It is presumed to be fully extinct in the wild throughout Italy.

Within the Iberian Peninsula, M. cervina formerly was recorded in locations such as Benavente, Valdemorillo and Atienza in Spain, and Peso da Régua in Portugal, where it is no longer extant. It has escaped from horticulture & established in Belgium, where it is considered invasive.

== Use ==
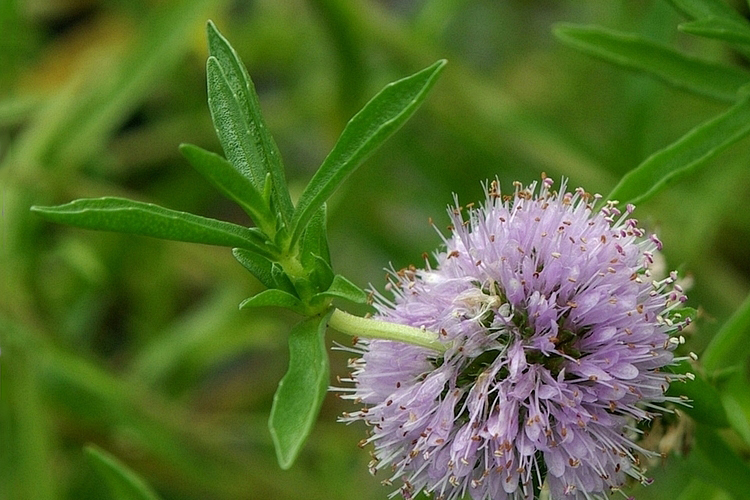
Detail of the whorled inflorescence of Mentha cervina

In his Natural History, Pliny the Elder describes a plant "Polyenemon," with a "seed like that of pennyroyal" and a "pleasant though pungent smell." This plant, "chewed and applied to wounds inflicted with iron" was identified with Mentha cervina by Pierre Desfontaines. An 1895 reference for druggists recommended Mentha cervina for its value both as an "aromatic" and a "nauseant."

The 1860 edition of Robert Hooper's Lexicon Medicum opined: "This plant possesses the virtues of pennyroyal in a very great degree; but is remarkably unpleasant. It is seldom employed but by the country people, who substitute it for pennyroyal."

In Portugal, it has been used whole, fresh or dry, as an addition to stews, salads, soups, cheeses and sauces. Various recipes for liqueur infusions are also recorded. Within the Alentejo region, it is used both medicinally and as a seasoning for traditional fish dishes. Purported medicinal uses of Mentha cervina include as an antiseptic, carminative, febrifuge and digestive, as well as possessing benefits to the respiratory system. Along with Mentha pulegium, it has seen traditional use as a repellent of pests.

In modern research, chemical constituents pulegone, menthol & isomentone have been reported to possess antioxidant, antibacterial and antifungal properties.
