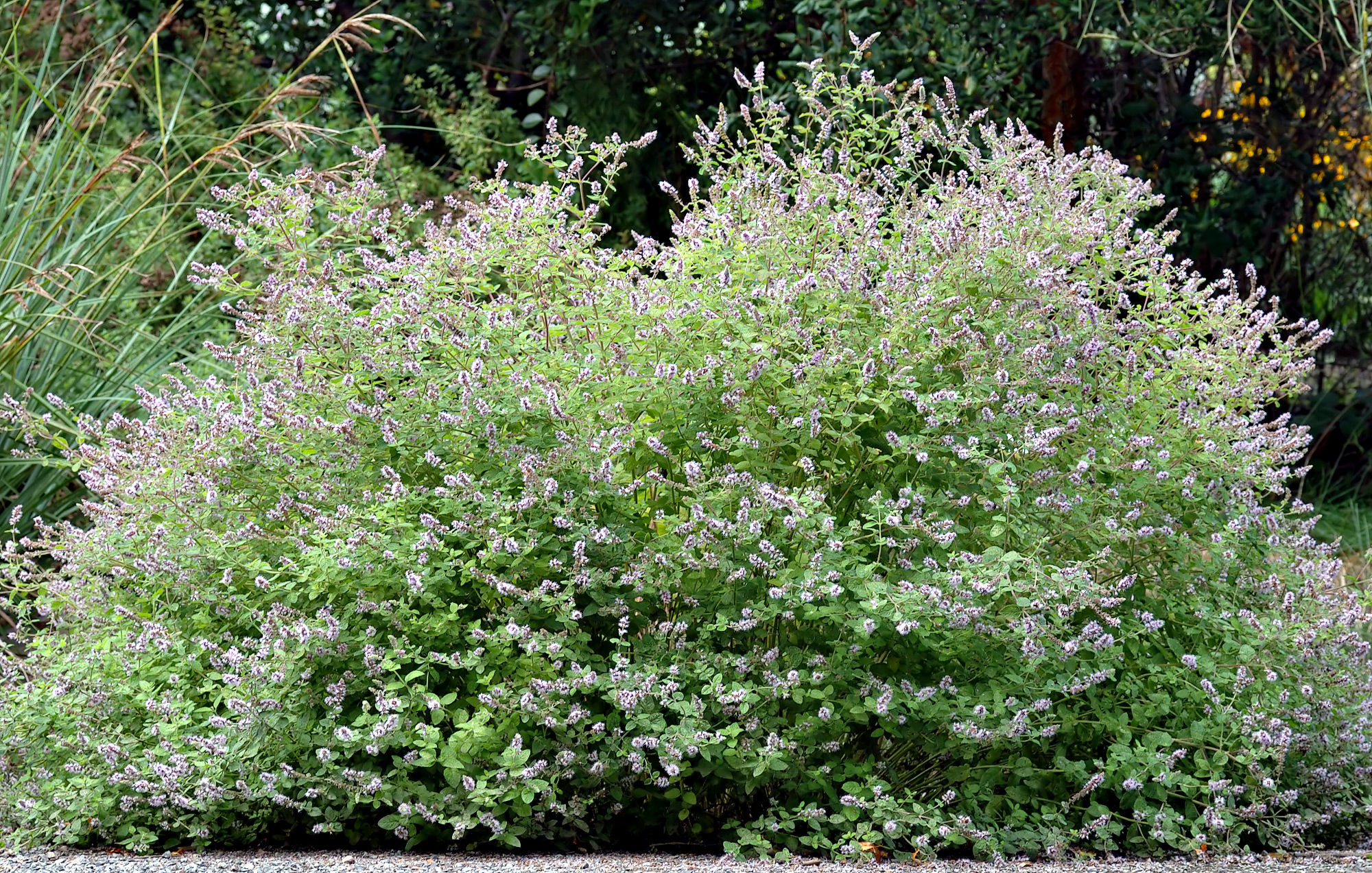

Conservation status
- Vulnerable (IUCN 3.1)

Scientific classification
- Kingdom: Plantae
- Clade: Tracheophytes
- Clade: Angiosperms
- Clade: Eudicots
- Clade: Asterids
- Order: Lamiales
- Family: Lamiaceae
- Genus: Mentha
- Species: M. gattefossei

Binomial name
- Mentha gattefossei Maire

= Mentha gattefossei =

Species of mint

Mentha gattefossei is a plant species in the genus Mentha, endemic to the Atlas Mountains of Morocco. It was first described by French botanist René Maire in 1922. Harvested for its essential oil, M. gattefossei has seen use in traditional medicine, pest control and as a food seasoning.

== Name ==
When he described it in 1922, Maire named Mentha gattefossei in honor of botanist Jean Gattefossé, in recognition of his contributions to the study of Moroccan herbs and aromatic plants.

Its vernacular names include Arabic Fliyyo dial jbel, as well as French Menthe de Perse and Menthe de Gatefossé.

== Taxonomy ==
Mentha gattefossei is accepted as a distinct species by authorities such as Plants of the World Online. Within the mints, it has historically been grouped with relatives such as Mentha pulegium, Mentha requienii and Mentha grandiflora within the "Pulegium" section. This was owing to a homoplasy in morphological features between it and M. pulegium. Maire himself, however, had speculated an ancestral connection to Mentha cervina. More recently, a 2004 phylogenetic study, analyzing chloroplast DNA, confirmed a link with M. cervina, placing them in a sub-clade, citing three shared insertion and deletion mutations between the species, as well as morphological and ecological similarities. It is now placed generally with other Mediterranean endemic species, including M. cervina and M. requienii, on the basis of multiple genetic grouping algorithms. Along with Mentha japonica and Mentha pulegium, it has a base chromosome number of x = 10.

Hybridization between M. gattefossei and other mints is difficult, and successful crosses are typically weak with a high susceptibility to powdery mildew. Sterile crosses with Mentha arvensis and Mentha aquatica have however been produced in experimental conditions.

== Description ==
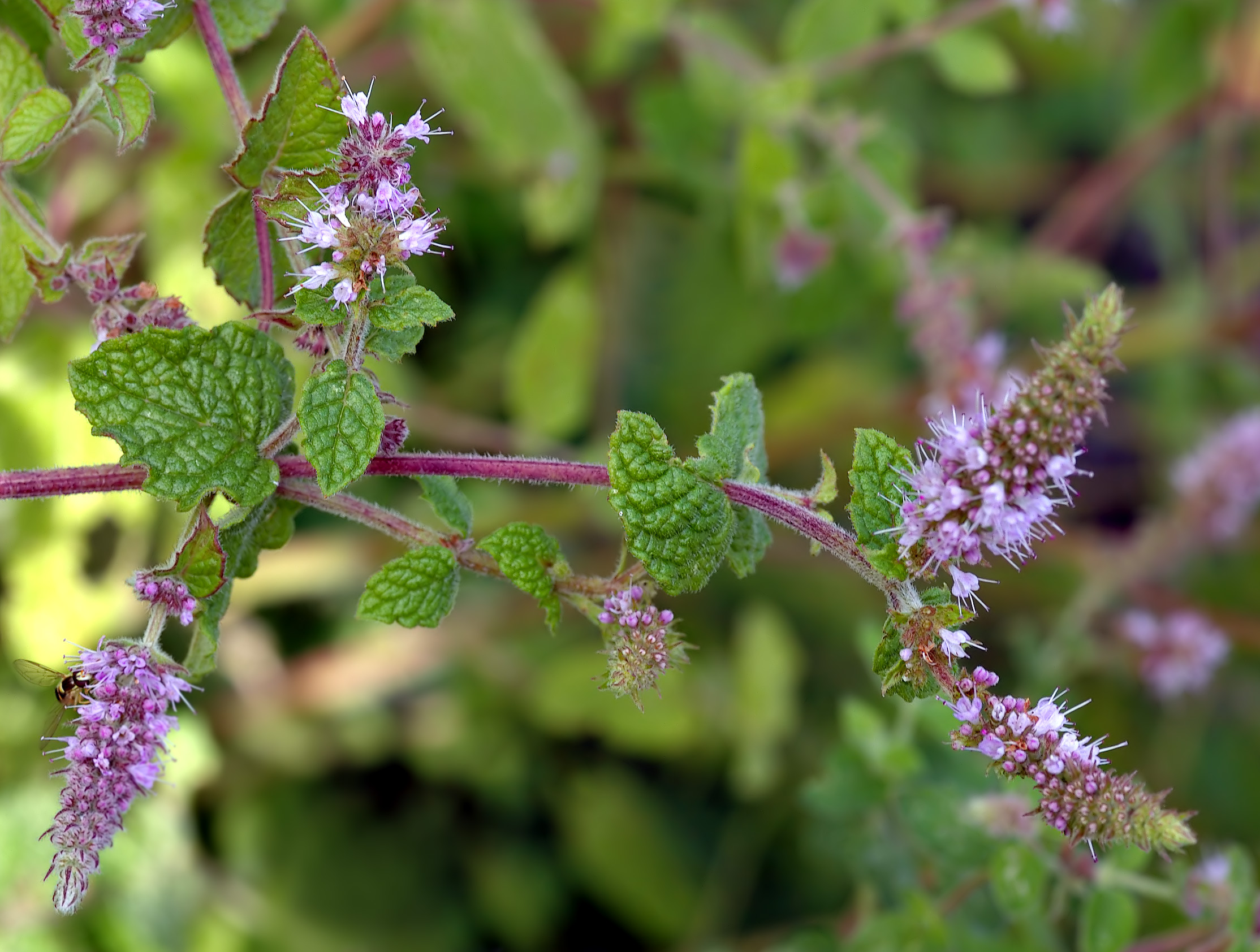
Detail showing sessile leaves along branch

Mentha gattefossei is a perennial plant with a creeping, branched rhizome. Its simple to slightly branched stems grow 20 to 30 centimeters high. Its 10 to 15 millimeter-length leaves are sessile, glabrous and broadly linear to oblanceolate in shape. Flowers form along verticillasters, pedicels 2 to 3 millimeters long, 2-lipped calyx possessing 5 lobes. Its corolla is whitish, 4 to 5 millimeters long.

Mentha gattefossei may be distinguished from most species within the Mentha genus due to its whitish apical spine on each calyx lobe, a feature it shares with only M. cervina. It may be distinguished from M. cervina by the number of calyx lobes. Maire further distinguished M. gattefossei by its unincised bracts.

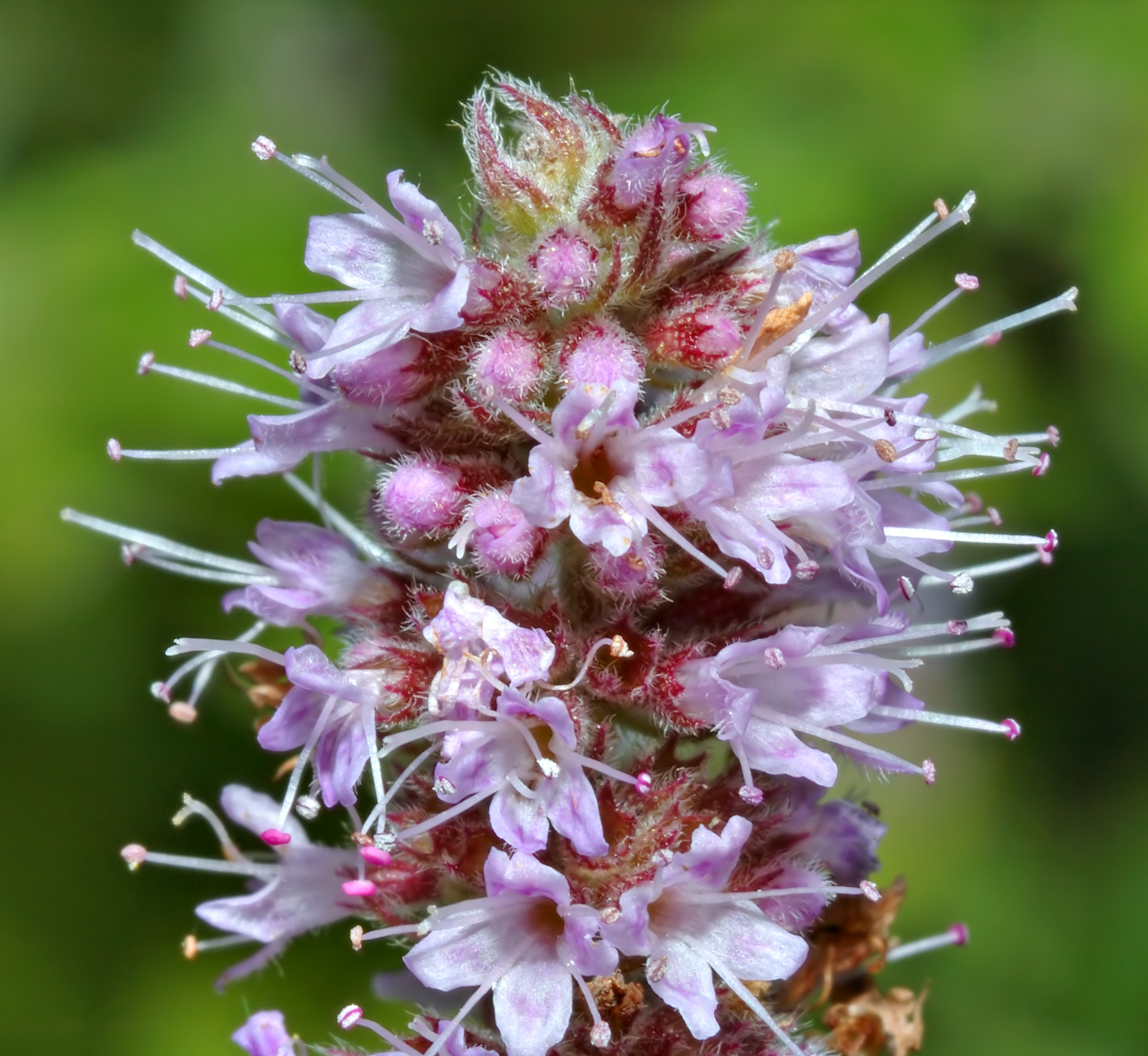
Detail of inflorescence

Its flowering season in its native range is in June and July. A study of experimental plantings in Moldova found its seed germination rate to be about 70%.

Its essential oil's main components are pulegone (68.4%) and menthone (10.4%). Other chemicals identified in smaller amounts include neomenthol, d-limonene, alpha-Pinene, beta-Pinene, eucalyptol and caryophyllene.

== Distribution ==
Mentha gattefossei is strictly endemic to the High Atlas, Middle Atlas, Anti Atlas and Saharan regions of Morocco, in an area estimated to be around 500 square kilometers. Its primary habitat is at the edge of dayas (pools which evaporate during the summer) in the Atlas Mountains. It also occupies other wet habitats, such as river banks, irrigation canals and damp meadows and pastures.

Due to its constrained distribution, it has been described as "among the rarest plants in the world." According to the IUCN, it is believed that warming due to climate change could have a significant impact on Mediterranean plants. Because of its rarity, international efforts have been made at propagation for conservation purposes. Experimentally, in vitro micropropagation has been successfully used to induce multiple shoots from axillary buds, which the authors proposed as a method for large-scale propagation and conservation.

== Use ==
Mentha gattefossei is used for its essential oil, as well as an aromatic herb in foods and teas. It has traditionally been consumed in Morocco as a decoction to promote general health. Its essential oil components pulegone and menthone are proposed to give it antioxidant properties. Its harvesting for medicinal and food reasons is cited as a reason for its decline in the wild.

In Morocco, its scent is used to repel insects who would otherwise damage stores of dried figs.
