= Mentha micrantha =

Scientific classification
- Kingdom: Plantae
- Clade: Tracheophytes
- Clade: Angiosperms
- Clade: Eudicots
- Clade: Asterids
- Order: Lamiales
- Family: Lamiaceae
- Genus: Mentha
- Species: M. micrantha

Binomial name
- Mentha micrantha Benth.

Synonyms
- Mentha pulegium var. micrantha Fisch. ex Benth.; Mentha pulegium subsp. micrantha (Fisch. ex Benth.) Briq.; Pulegium micranthum Claus, Beitr.; Pulegium deserticola Claus

Species of mint

Mentha micrantha, is a plant species in the genus Mentha, native to western Kazakhstan and southeastern Russia. The species was described in 1890 by botanist George Bentham. Its epithet, micrantha, means "with small flowers." It is unique among its genus as the only species that is an annual plant.

== Taxonomy ==
The proper classification of Mentha micrantha is contentious. Several taxonomy references, such as Plants of the World Online and the Global Biodiversity Information Facility, accept it as a distinct species. A 2006 treatment of the genus Mentha however asserted it to be a variety of Mentha pulegium.

Where treated as distinct, M. micrantha has been considered to belong to the section Pulegium within the Mentha genus. This section associates it with plants such as M. pulegium as well as Mentha gattefossei.

== Description ==
Mentha micrantha is a small annual plant, growing erect, branched, square-shaped stems measuring from 12 to 30 centimeters high. Its leaves are almost entire, oblong or ovate in shape. It flowers in verticillaster 7 to 12 millimeters in length, producing bi-labiate corollas, pink, rose-lilac or purple in color.

== Distribution ==
Mentha micrantha is distributed throughout southeast Russia and western to central Kazakhstan. It occupies steppe areas and sinkholes. It is a hygrophyte, preferring wet soil conditions.
