= Mentha × wirtgeniana =

Scientific classification
- Kingdom: Plantae
- Clade: Tracheophytes
- Clade: Angiosperms
- Clade: Eudicots
- Clade: Asterids
- Order: Lamiales
- Family: Lamiaceae
- Genus: Mentha
- Species: M. × wirtgeniana

Binomial name
- Mentha × wirtgeniana F.W.Schultz

Synonyms
- Mentha × rubra var. wirtgeniana (F.W.Schultz) Rouy; Mentha × rubra var. wirtgeniana (F.W.Schultz) Heinr.Braun; Mentha × rubra subsp. wirtgeniana (F.W.Schultz) Briq.; Mentha × smithiana var. wirtgeniana (F.W.Schultz) J.Duvign. & Lebeau, nom. superfl.

Species of flowering plant

Mentha × wirtgeniana, known as tall mint, is a hybrid mint species within the genus Mentha, native to Europe. It was first described in 1854.

== Description ==
Mentha × wirtgeniana is a perennial plant that can grow up to about 1 metre tall.

== Taxonomy ==
Mentha × wirtgeniana was first described by Friedrich Wilhelm Schultz in 1854. It was later often treated as a variety or subspecies of Mentha × rubra, but is accepted as a full hybrid species by Plants of the World Online as of November 2025. It is a hybrid between M. spicata (spearmint) and M. × verticillata, itself a hybrid between M. aquatica and M. arvensis, and often arises spontaneously in the presence of both parents.

== Distribution ==
Mentha × wirtgeniana is native to Europe from France to Romania. It has been introduced elsewhere, including Great Britain and Ireland, Greece, Cape Verde, and Nova Scotia.

== Cultivation and uses ==
It is a moderately cold-hardy, fast-growing, plant, able to tolerate temperatures down to around -20°C when fully dormant.

This hybrid is occasionally cultivated in European gardens, displayed for aromatic purposes, though it has a low essential oil content.
