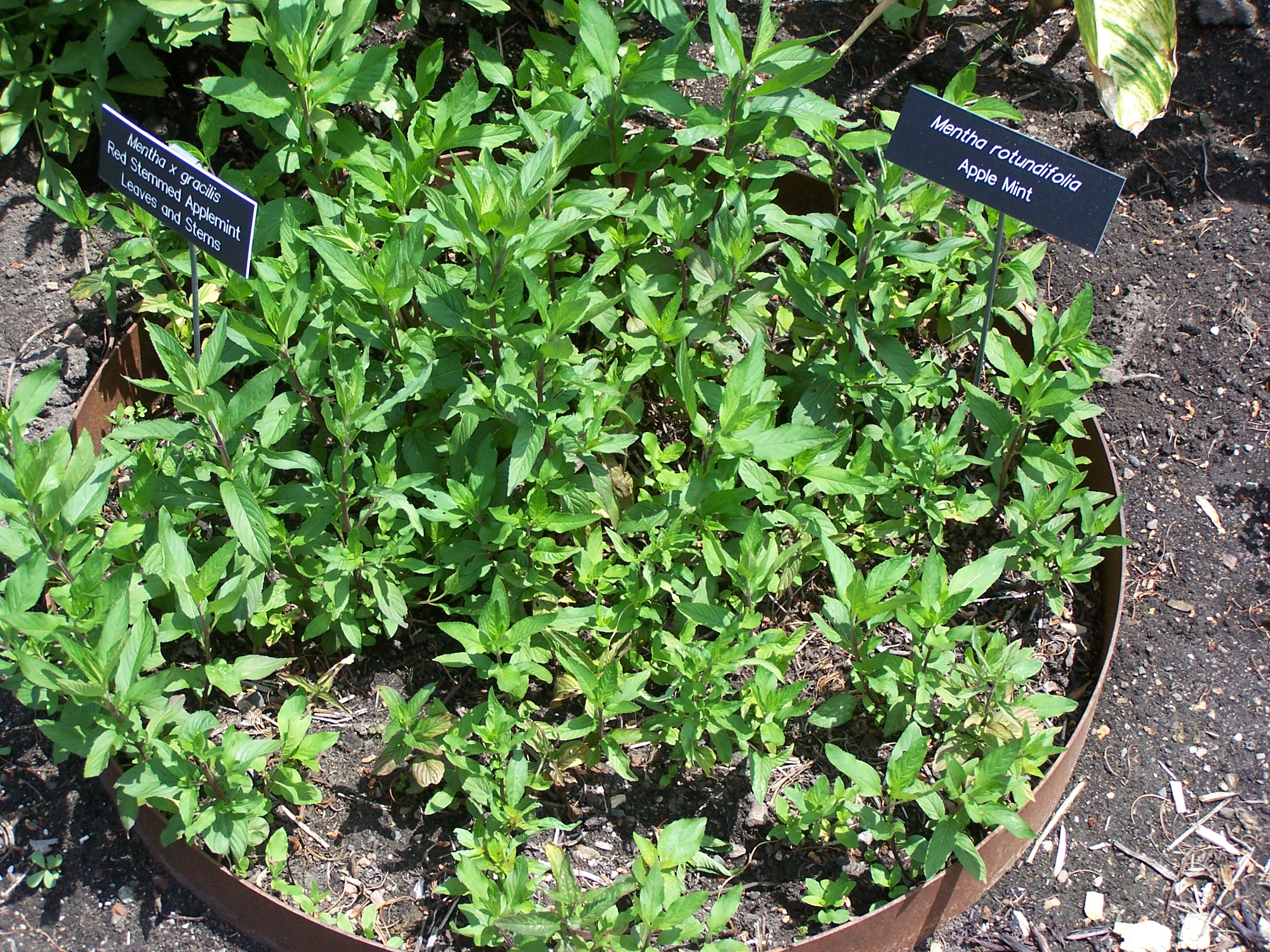
- Mentha × gracilis (left) and M. rotundifolia

Scientific classification
- Kingdom: Plantae
- Clade: Tracheophytes
- Clade: Angiosperms
- Clade: Eudicots
- Clade: Asterids
- Order: Lamiales
- Family: Lamiaceae
- Genus: Mentha
- Species: M. × gracilis

Binomial name
- Mentha × gracilis Sole

= Mentha × gracilis =

Species of flowering plant

Mentha × gracilis (syn. Mentha × gentilis L.; syn. Mentha cardiaca (S.F. Gray) Bak.) is a hybrid mint species within the genus Mentha, a sterile hybrid between Mentha arvensis (cornmint) and Mentha spicata (native spearmint). It is cultivated for its essential oil, used to flavour spearmint chewing gum. It is known by the common names of gingermint, redmint and Scotchmint in Europe, and as Scotch spearmint in North America.

== History ==
Gingermint is a naturally occurring hybrid indigenous throughout the overlapping native regions of cornmint and spearmint in Europe and Asia. It was first introduced to North America by a gardener in Wisconsin in 1908; due to the Scottish origin of the variety and its similarity in flavour to spearmint, it is known there as Scotch spearmint. From Wisconsin it spread as a crop throughout the US Midwest and later to the Pacific Northwest states of Washington, Oregon, and Idaho, where the majority of global Scotch spearmint production is now concentrated. In 1990 it was brought from the Pacific Northwest to southern Alberta and Saskatchewan in Canada, which has become the second largest production region supplying about 25% of the North American market.

== Cultivation ==
As a sterile hybrid gingermint does not set seed; it is instead propagated by plant cuttings from the runners of healthy mints. It is most commonly cultivated for steam distillation of its essential oil. Production is concentrated in North America north of the 41st parallel; below the 40th parallel north summer day lengths are insufficiently long to produce quality essential oil. In the Pacific northwest Scotch spearmint oil, along with native spearmint oil, is protected by a marketing board for farmers. In 2000, 89.4 tonnes of spearmint oil were produced in the US Midwest, 420.9 tonnes in the Pacific northwest, and 167.9 tonnes in Canada. An additional 10 tonnes were produced in India and limited quantities were produced in France and Argentina.

=== Diseases ===
Verticillium wilt is a major constraint in Mentha × gracilis cultivation.

== Uses ==
Since the smell of ginger mint wards off rats and mice, it is placed in granaries to keep pests away from the grain. In North America, Scotch spearmint essential oil is used in flavouring chewing gum and candies. It is used as the traditional flavouring of Scotch mint candies. In Vietnamese cuisine the fresh herb is used as a flavouring in chicken or beef pho. As a medicinal herb it is used to treat fevers, headaches, and digestive ailments.
