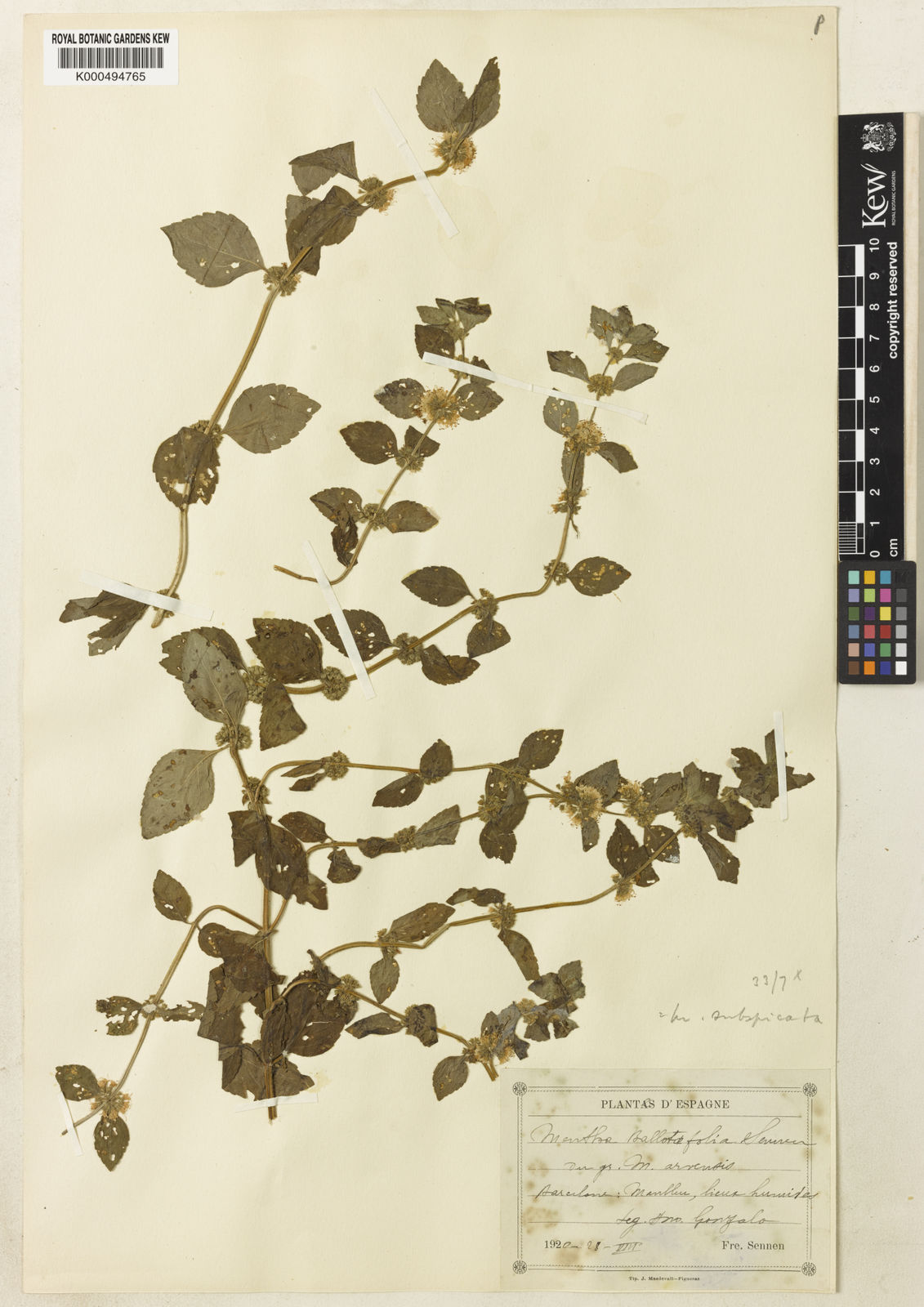
- A specimen of Carinthian Mint, taken in 1920.

Scientific classification
- Kingdom: Plantae
- Clade: Tracheophytes
- Clade: Angiosperms
- Clade: Eudicots
- Clade: Asterids
- Order: Lamiales
- Family: Lamiaceae
- Genus: Mentha
- Species: M. × carinthiaca

Binomial name
- Mentha × carinthiaca Host

Synonyms
- Mentha × schultziana Topitz, nom. superfl.; Mentha × schultziana var. carinthiaca (Host) Topitz, nom. superfl.; Mentha × muelleriana F.W.Schultz

= Mentha × carinthiaca =

Species of flowering plant

Mentha × carinthiaca (syn. Mentha × schultziana), known as the Austrian or Carinthian mint, is a hybrid mint species within the genus Mentha, native to Europe and locally extinct in the United Kingdom and Belgium.

== Name ==
This species is toponymically named after Carinthia, the region in Austria which the hybrid was discovered. In German, it is called Kärntner Minze; Menthe de Carinthie in French; and Koroška Meta in Slovene, all of which translate to "Carinthian mint".

== Description ==
It is a perennial species which primarily grows in the temperate regions. It is a hybrid between Mentha arvensis and Mentha suaveolens.

It generally prefers to be exposed to between full sun to partial shade.
