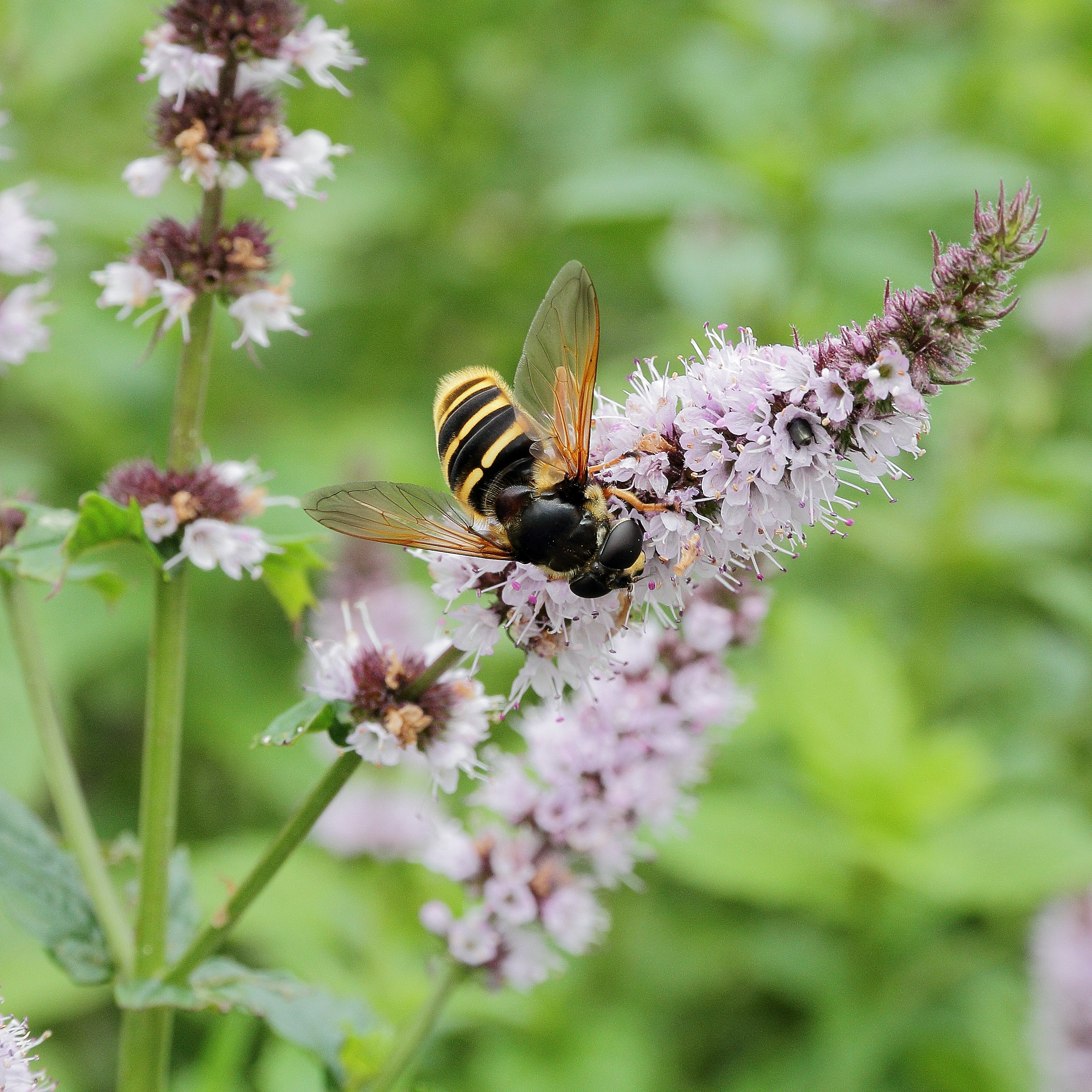
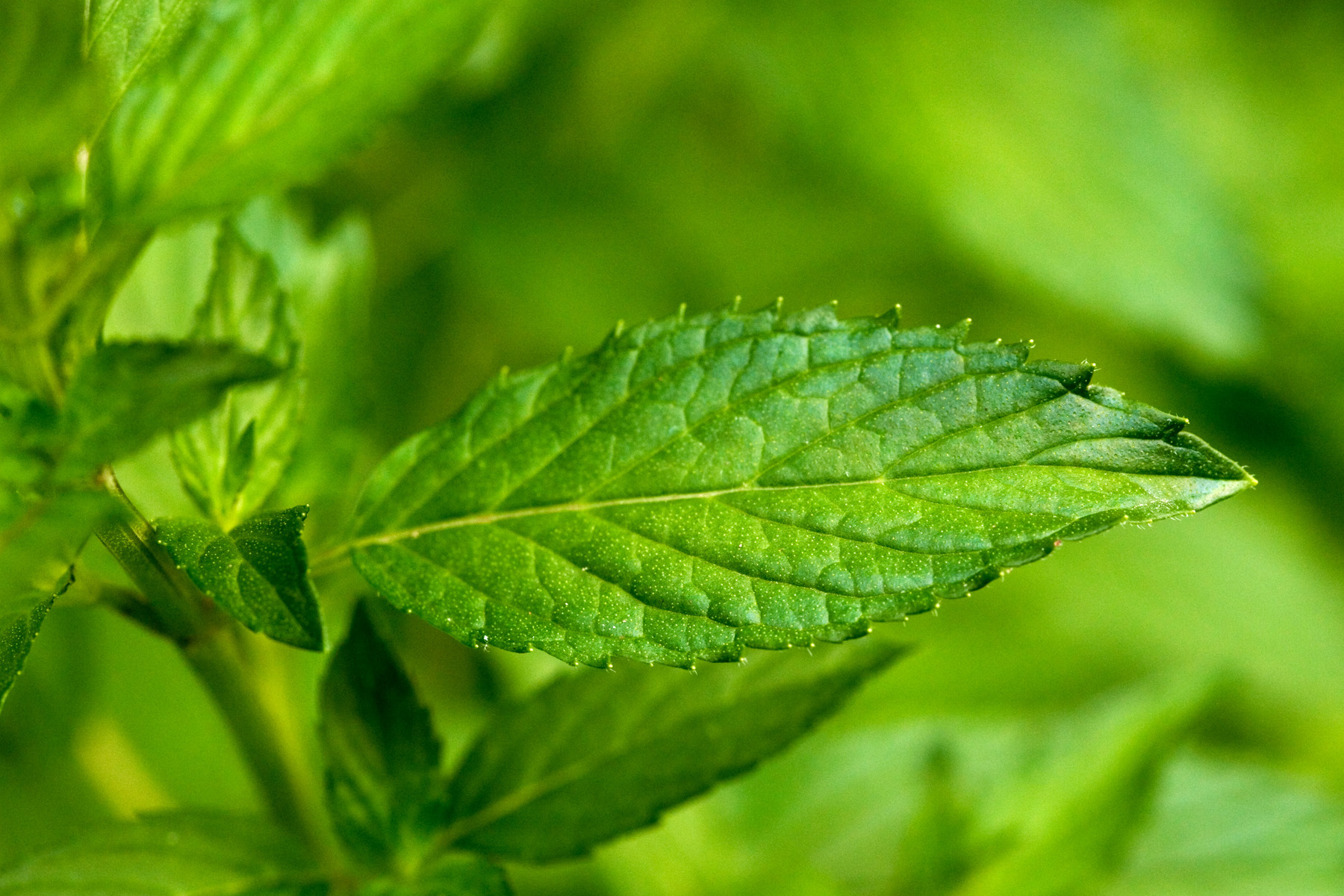
- Mentha spicata (Spearmint); Mentha × piperita (Peppermint)

Scientific classification
- Kingdom: Plantae
- Clade: Embryophytes
- Clade: Tracheophytes
- Clade: Angiosperms
- Clade: Eudicots
- Clade: Asterids
- Order: Lamiales
- Family: Lamiaceae
- Subfamily: Nepetoideae
- Tribe: Mentheae
- Genus: Mentha; L.

Type species
- Mentha spicata L.

Synonyms
- Pulegium Mill.; Preslia Opiz; Audibertia Benth.; Menthella Pérard; Minthe St.-Lag.

= Mentha =

Genus of flowering plants

Mentha, also known as mint (from Greek μίνθα míntha, Linear B mi-ta), is a genus of flowering plants in the mint family, Lamiaceae. It is estimated that 18 to 24 species exist, but the exact distinction between species is unclear. Hybridization occurs naturally where some species' ranges overlap. Many hybrids and cultivars are known.

The genus has a subcosmopolitan distribution, growing best in wet environments and moist soils.

== Description ==
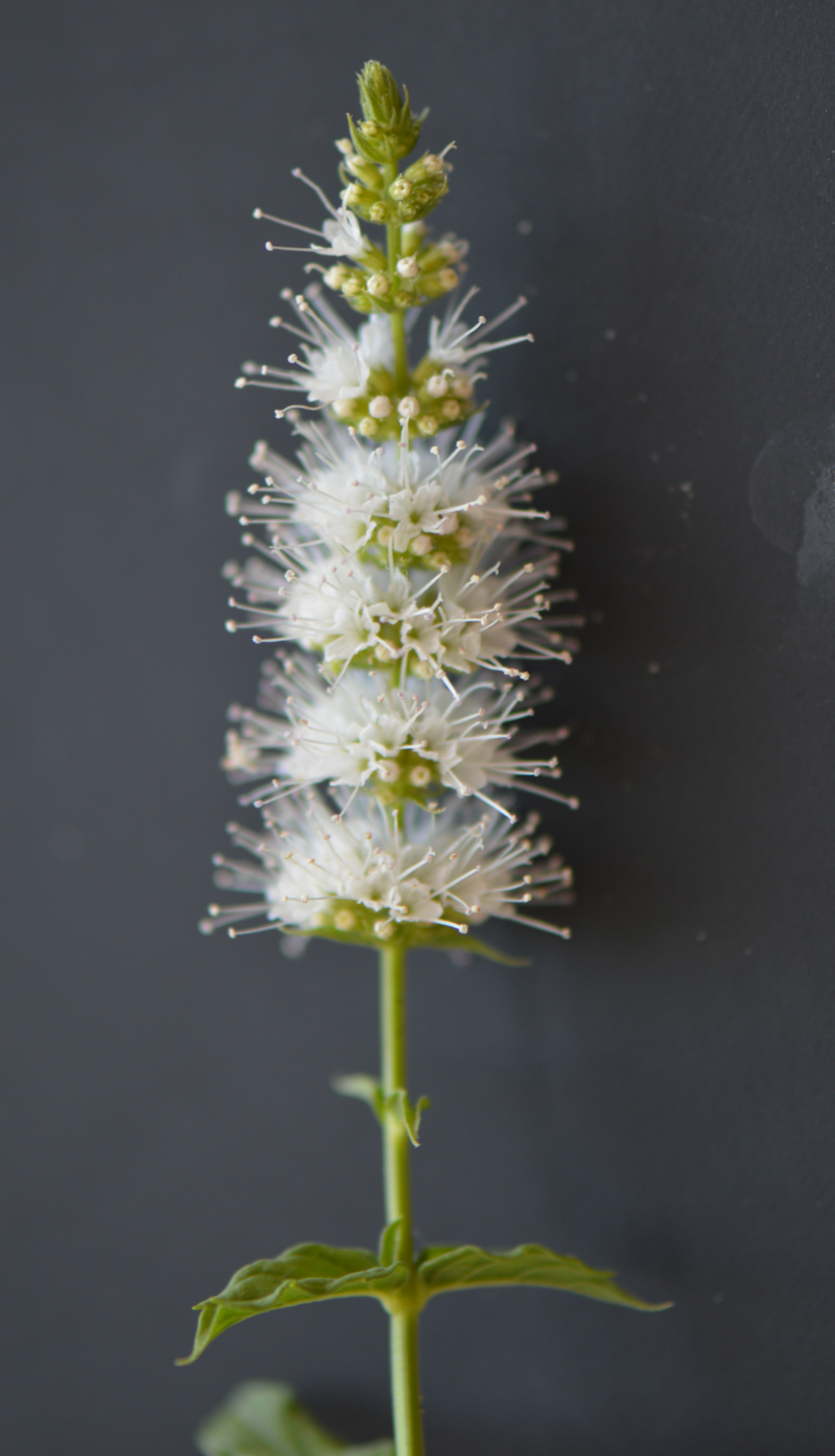
Flowering verticillasters of a spearmint

Mints are aromatic, almost exclusively perennial herbs. They have wide-spreading underground and overground stolons and erect, square, branched stems. Mints will grow 10–120 cm (4–47 in) tall and can spread over an indeterminate area. Due to their tendency to spread unchecked, some mints are considered invasive.

The leaves are arranged in opposite pairs, from oblong to lanceolate, often downy, and with a serrated margin. Leaf colours range from dark green and gray-green to purple, blue, and sometimes pale yellow.

The flowers are produced in long bracts from leaf axils. They are white to purple and produced in false whorls called verticillasters. The corolla is two-lipped with four subequal lobes, the upper lobe usually the largest. The fruit is a nutlet, containing one to four seeds.

== Taxonomy ==
Mentha is a member of the tribe Mentheae in the subfamily Nepetoideae. The tribe contains about 65 genera, and relationships within it remain obscure. Authors have disagreed on the circumscription of Mentha. For example, M. cervina has been placed in Pulegium and Preslia, and M. cunninghamii has been placed in Micromeria. In 2004, a molecular phylogenetic study indicated that both M. cervina and M. cunninghamii should be included in Mentha. However, M. cunninghamii was excluded in a 2007 treatment of the genus.

More than 3,000 names have been published in the genus Mentha, at ranks from species to forms, the majority of which are regarded as synonyms or illegitimate names. The taxonomy of the genus is made difficult because many species hybridize readily, or are themselves derived from possibly ancient hybridization events. Seeds from hybrids give rise to variable offspring, which may spread through vegetative propagation. The variability has led to what has been described as "paroxysms of species and subspecific taxa"; for example, one taxonomist published 434 new mint taxa for central Europe alone between 1911 and 1916. Recent sources recognize between 18 and 24 species.

=== Species ===
As of November 2025, Plants of the World Online recognized the following species:

- Mentha alaica Boriss.
- Mentha aquatica L. – water mint, marsh mint
- Mentha arvensis L. – corn mint, wild mint, Japanese peppermint, field mint, banana mint
- Mentha atrolilacina B.J.Conn & D.J.Duval – slender mint
- Mentha australis R.Br. – Australian mint
- Mentha canadensis L. – Canada mint, American wild mint
- Mentha cervina L. – Hart's pennyroyal
- Mentha choujunensis A.H.Ganie, T.Islam & Khuroo
- Mentha cunninghamii (Benth.) Benth. – New Zealand mint
- Mentha dahurica Fisch. ex Benth. – Dahurian thyme
- Mentha darvasica Boriss.
- Mentha diemenica Spreng. – slender mint
- Mentha gattefossei Maire
- Mentha grandiflora Benth.
- Mentha japonica (Miq.) Makino
- Mentha laxiflora Benth. – forest mint
- Mentha longifolia (L.) L. – horse mint
- Mentha micrantha (Fisch. ex Benth.) Heinr.Braun
- Mentha pamiroalaica Boriss.
- Mentha pulegium L. – pennyroyal
- Mentha requienii Benth. – Corsican mint
- Mentha royleana Wall. ex Benth.
- Mentha satureioides R.Br. – native pennyroyal
- Mentha spicata L. – spearmint, garden mint (a cultivar of spearmint)
- Mentha suaveolens Ehrh. – apple mint, pineapple mint (a variegated cultivar of apple mint)

=== Hybrids ===
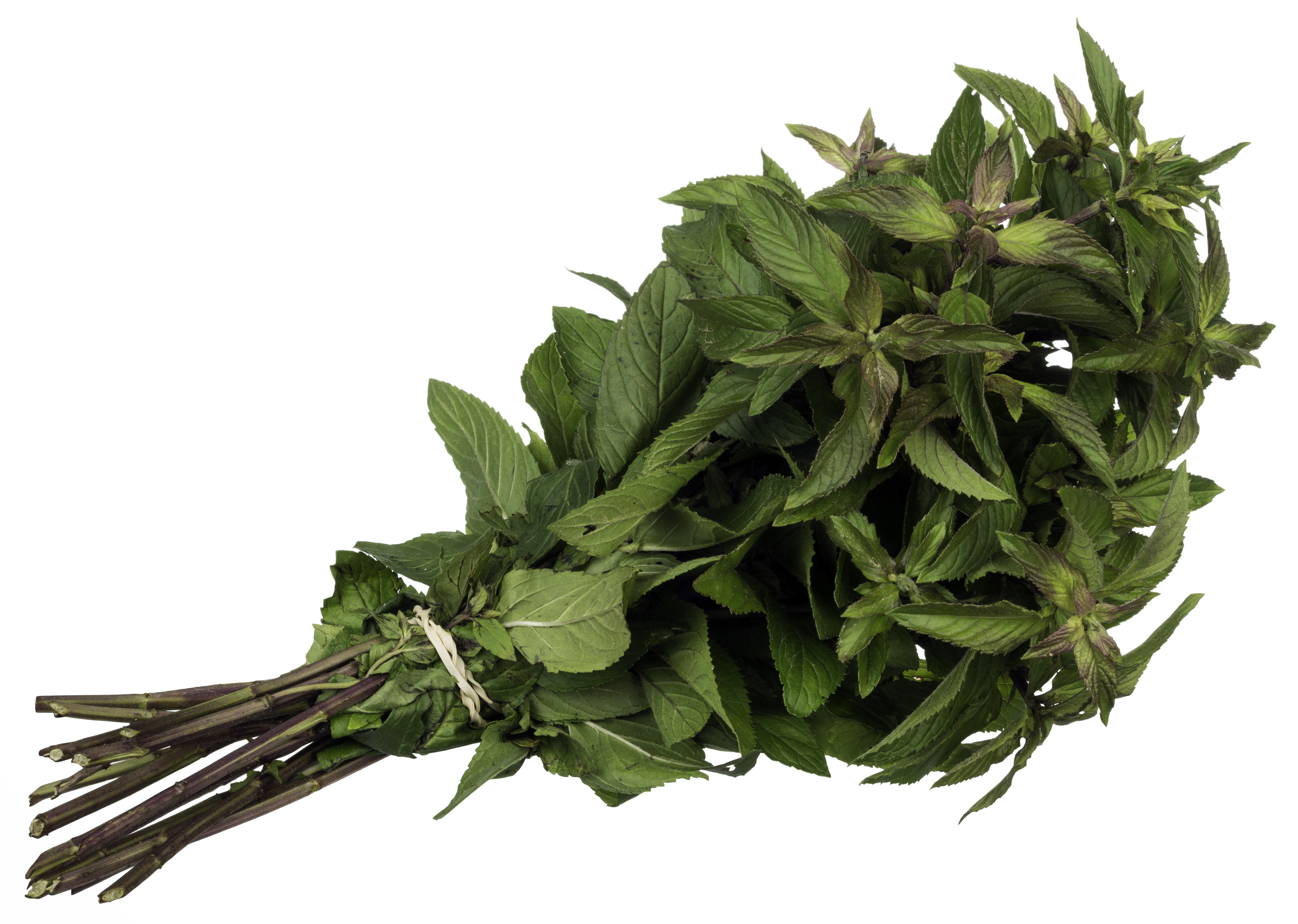
The Mentha × piperita hybrid known as "chocolate mint"

The mint genus has a large grouping of recognized hybrids. Those accepted by Plants of the World Online are listed below. Parent species are taken from Tucker & Naczi (2007). Synonyms, along with cultivars and varieties where available, are included within the specific nothospecies.

- Mentha × carinthiaca Host – M. arvensis × M. suaveolens
- Mentha × dalmatica Tausch – M. arvensis × M. longifolia
- Mentha × dumetorum Schult. – M. aquatica × M. longifolia
- Mentha × gayeri Trautm. – M. longifolia × M. spicata × M. suaveolens
- Mentha × gracilis Sole (syn. Mentha × gentilis) – M. arvensis × M. spicata – ginger mint, Scotch spearmint
- Mentha × kuemmerlei Trautm. – M. aquatica × M. spicata × M. suaveolens
- Mentha × locyana Borbás – M. longifolia × M. verticillata
- Mentha × piperita L. – M. aquatica × M. spicata – peppermint, chocolate mint
- Mentha × pyramidalis Ten. – M. aquatica × M. microphylla
- Mentha × rotundifolia (L.) Huds. – M. longifolia × M. suaveolens – false apple mint
- Mentha × suavis Guss. (syn. Mentha × amblardii, Mentha × lamiifolia, Mentha × langii, Mentha × mauponii, Mentha × maximilianea, Mentha × rodriguezii, Mentha × weissenburgensis) – M. aquatica × M. suaveolens
- Mentha × verticillata L. – M. aquatica × M. arvensis
- Mentha × villosa Huds. (syn. M. nemorosa) – M. spicata × M. suaveolens – large apple mint, foxtail mint, hairy mint, woolly mint, Cuban mint, mojito mint, and yerba buena in Cuba
- Mentha × villosa-nervata Opiz – M. longifolia × M. spicata – sharp-toothed mint
- Mentha × wirtgeniana F.W.Schultz (syn. Mentha × smithiana) – M. aquatica × M. arvensis × M. spicata – red raripila mint

=== Common names and cultivars ===
There are hundreds of common English names for species and cultivars of Mentha. These include:

- Apple mint – Mentha suaveolens and Mentha × rotundifolia
- Banana mint – Mentha arvensis 'Banana'
- Bowles mint – Mentha villosa and Mentha × villosa 'Alopecuroides'
- Canada mint – Mentha canadensis
- Chocolate mint – Mentha × piperita 'Chocolate'
- Corsican mint – Mentha requienii
- Cuba mint – Mentha × villosa
- Curly mint – Mentha spicata 'Curly'
- Eau de Cologne mint – Mentha × piperita 'Citrata'
- Field mint – Mentha arvensis
- Flea mint – Mentha requienii
- Ginger mint – Mentha × gracilis
- Gray mint – Mentha longifolia
- Green mint – Mentha spicata
- Grey mint – Mentha longifolia
- Japanese peppermint – Mentha arvensis var. piperascens
- Japanese mint or Japanese medicine mint – Mentha spicata 'Abura'
- Kiwi mint – Mentha cunninghamii
- Lemon mint – Mentha × piperita var. citrata and Mentha × gentilis
- Marsh mint – Mentha aquatica
- Meadow mint – Mentha × gracilis and Mentha arvensis
- Mojito mint – Mentha spicata 'Mojito'
- Moroccan mint – Mentha spicata var. crispa 'Moroccan' and mints collected in Morocco
- Pennyroyal – Mentha pulegium
- Peppermint – Mentha × piperita and sometimes Mentha requienii
- Pineapple mint – Mentha suaveolens 'Variegata' and Mentha suaveolens 'Pineapple'
- Polemint – Mentha pulegium
- Red raripila mint – Mentha × wirtgeniana
- Round leaf mint – Mentha suaveolens
- Spearmint – Mentha spicata
- Strawberry mint – Mentha × piperita 'Strawberry'
- Swiss mint – Mentha × piperita 'Swiss'
- Tall mint – Mentha × wirtgeniana
- Tea mint – Mentha × verticillata
- Toothmint – Mentha × smithiana
- Water mint – Mentha aquatica
- Woolly mint – Mentha × rotundifolia

== Etymology ==
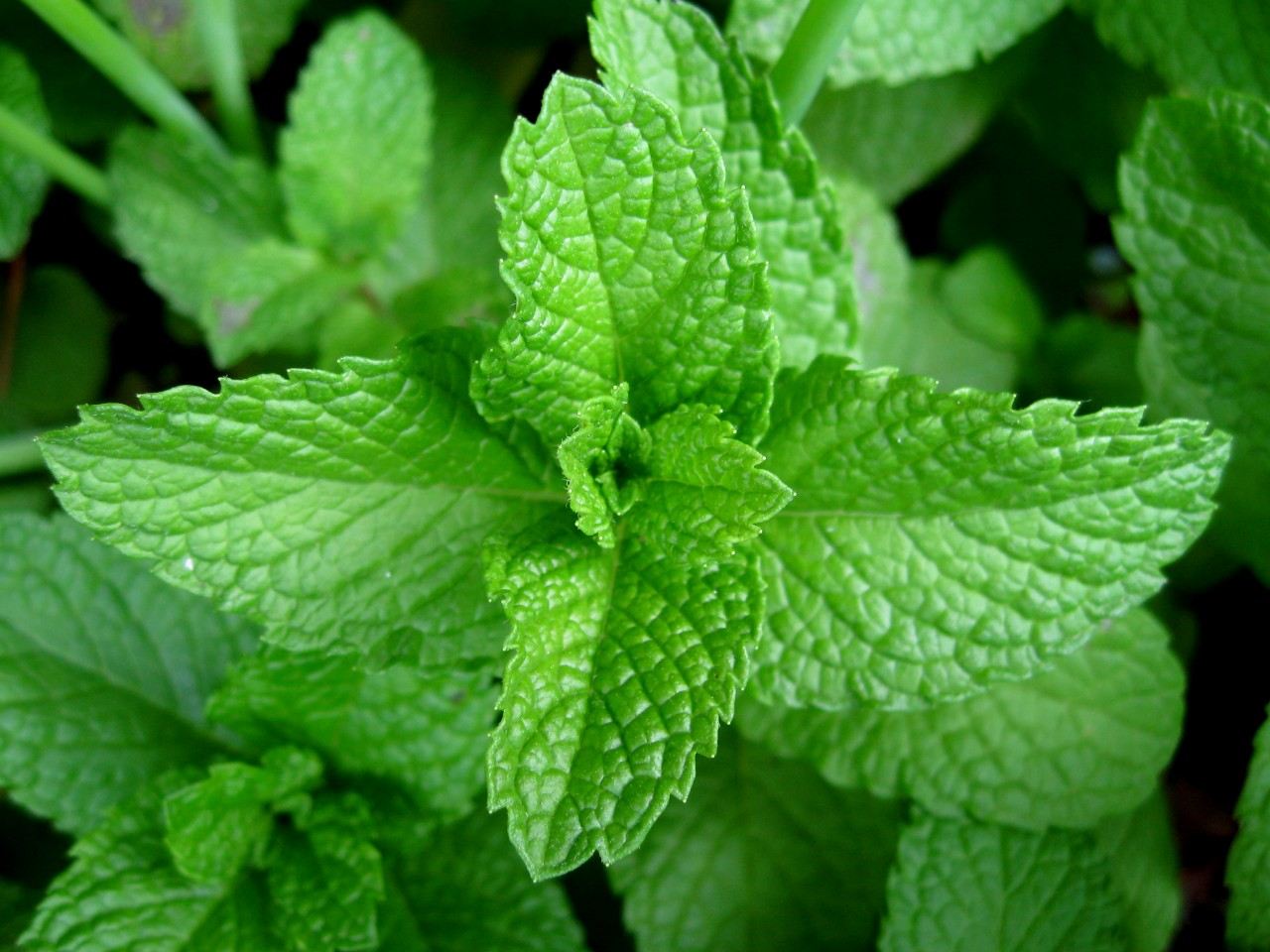
An example of mint leaves

The word "mint" descends from the Latin word mentha or menta, which is rooted in the Greek words μίνθα mintha, μίνθη minthē or μίντη mintē meaning "spearmint". The plant was personified in Greek mythology as Minthe, a nymph who was beloved by Hades and was transformed into a mint plant by either Persephone or Demeter. This, in turn, ultimately derived from a proto-Indo-European root that is also the origin of the Sanskrit -mantha, mathana (premna serratifolia).

References to "mint leaves", without a qualifier like "peppermint" or "apple mint", generally refer to spearmint leaves.

In Spain and Central and South America, mint is known as menta. In Lusophone countries, especially in Portugal, mint species are popularly known as hortelã. In many Indo-Aryan languages, it is called pudīna: Urdu: پودینہ, Hindi: पुदीना, Sindhi: ڦُودنو, Bengali: পুদিনা borrowed from Persian پودنه pudna or پونه puna meaning "pennyroyal".

The taxonomic family Lamiaceae is known as the mint family. It includes many other aromatic herbs, including most of the more common cooking herbs, such as basil, rosemary, sage, oregano, and catnip.

As an English colloquial term, any small mint-flavored confectionery item can be called a mint.

=== Other plants called "mint" ===
There are a number of plants that have mint in the common English name but which do not belong to the genus Mentha:

- Agastache sp. – known as horse mints
- Calamintha sp. (syn. Clinopodium) – known as calamints
- Clinopodium acinos (syn. Acinos arvensis) – known as backle mint
- Elsholtzia ciliata – known as comb mint, crested late summer mint
- Melissa officinalis – known as balm mint
- Nepeta sp. – known as cat mint or catnip
- Origanum sp. – known as rock mint
- Persicaria odorata – known as Vietnamese mint
- Sideritis montana – known as sider mint
- Mexican mint marigold is Tagetes lucida in the sunflower family (Asteraceae)

== Distribution and habitat ==
The genus has a subcosmopolitan distribution across Europe, Africa – (Southern Africa), Asia, Australia – Oceania, North America and South America. Its species can be found in many environments, but most grow best in wet environments and moist soils.

Mentha pliocenica fossil seeds have been excavated in Pliocene deposits of Dvorets on the right bank of the Dnieper river between the cities of Rechitsa and Loyew, in south-eastern Belarus. The fossil seeds are similar to the seeds of Mentha aquatica and Mentha arvensis.

== Ecology ==
Mints are used as food by the larvae of some Lepidoptera species, including buff ermine moths, and by beetles, such as Chrysolina coerulans (blue mint beetle) and C. herbacea (mint leaf beetle).

== Cultivation ==
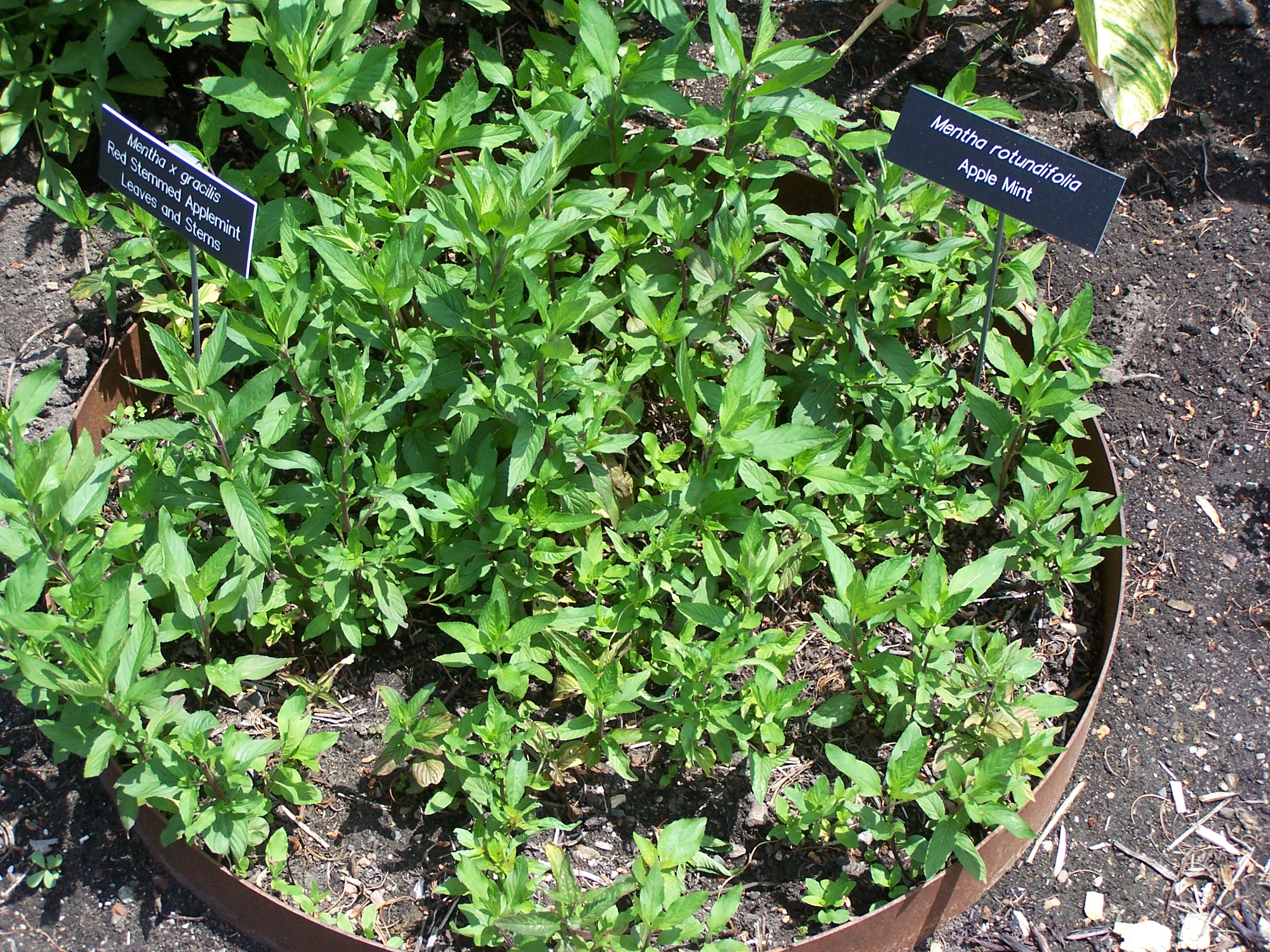
Mentha x gracilis and M. rotundifolia: The steel ring is to control the spread of the plant.

All mints thrive near pools of water, lakes, rivers, and cool moist spots in partial shade. In general, mints tolerate a wide range of conditions, and can also be grown in full sun. Mint grows all year round.

They are fast-growing, extending their reach along surfaces through a network of runners. Due to their speedy growth, one plant of each desired mint, along with a little care, will provide more than enough mint for home use. Some mint species are more invasive than others. Even with the less invasive mints, care should be taken when mixing any mint with any other plants, lest the mint take over. To control mints in an open environment, they should be planted in deep, bottomless containers sunk in the ground, or planted above ground in tubs and barrels.

Some mints can be propagated by seed, but growth from seed can be an unreliable method for raising mint for two reasons: mint seeds are highly variable (i.e. one might not end up with what was supposedly planted) and some mint varieties are sterile. It is more effective to take and plant cuttings from the runners of healthy mints.

The most common and popular mints for commercial cultivation are peppermint (Mentha × piperita), native spearmint (Mentha spicata), Scotch spearmint (Mentha x gracilis), and cornmint (Mentha arvensis); also (more recently) apple mint (Mentha suaveolens).

Mints are supposed to make good companion plants, repelling insect pests and attracting beneficial ones. They are susceptible to whitefly and aphids.

Harvesting of mint leaves can be done at any time. Fresh leaves should be used immediately or stored up to a few days in plastic bags in a refrigerator. Optionally, leaves can be frozen in ice cube trays. Dried mint leaves should be stored in an airtight container placed in a cool, dark, dry area.

== Uses ==
=== Culinary ===
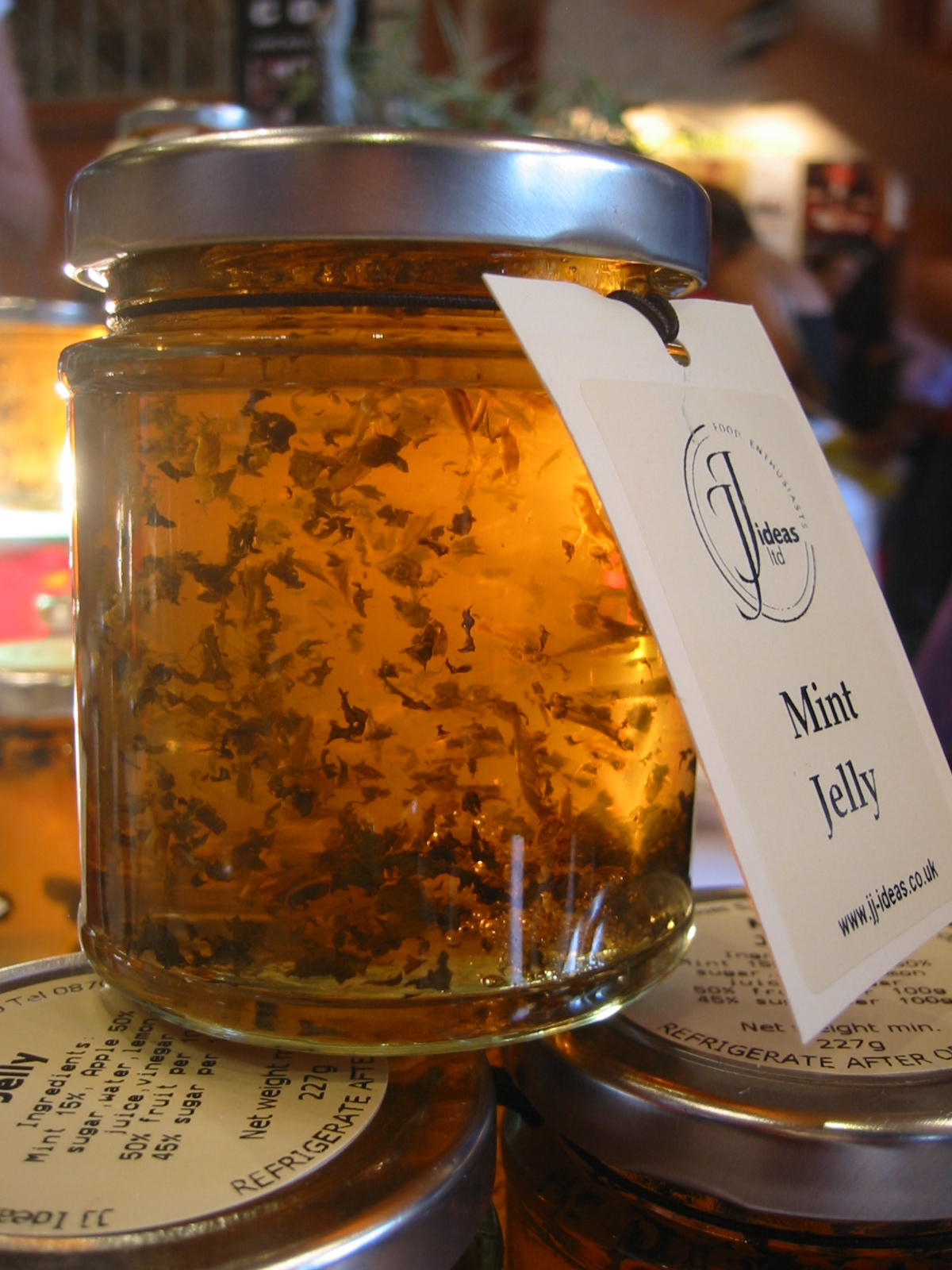
A jar of mint jelly, a traditional condiment served with lamb dishes

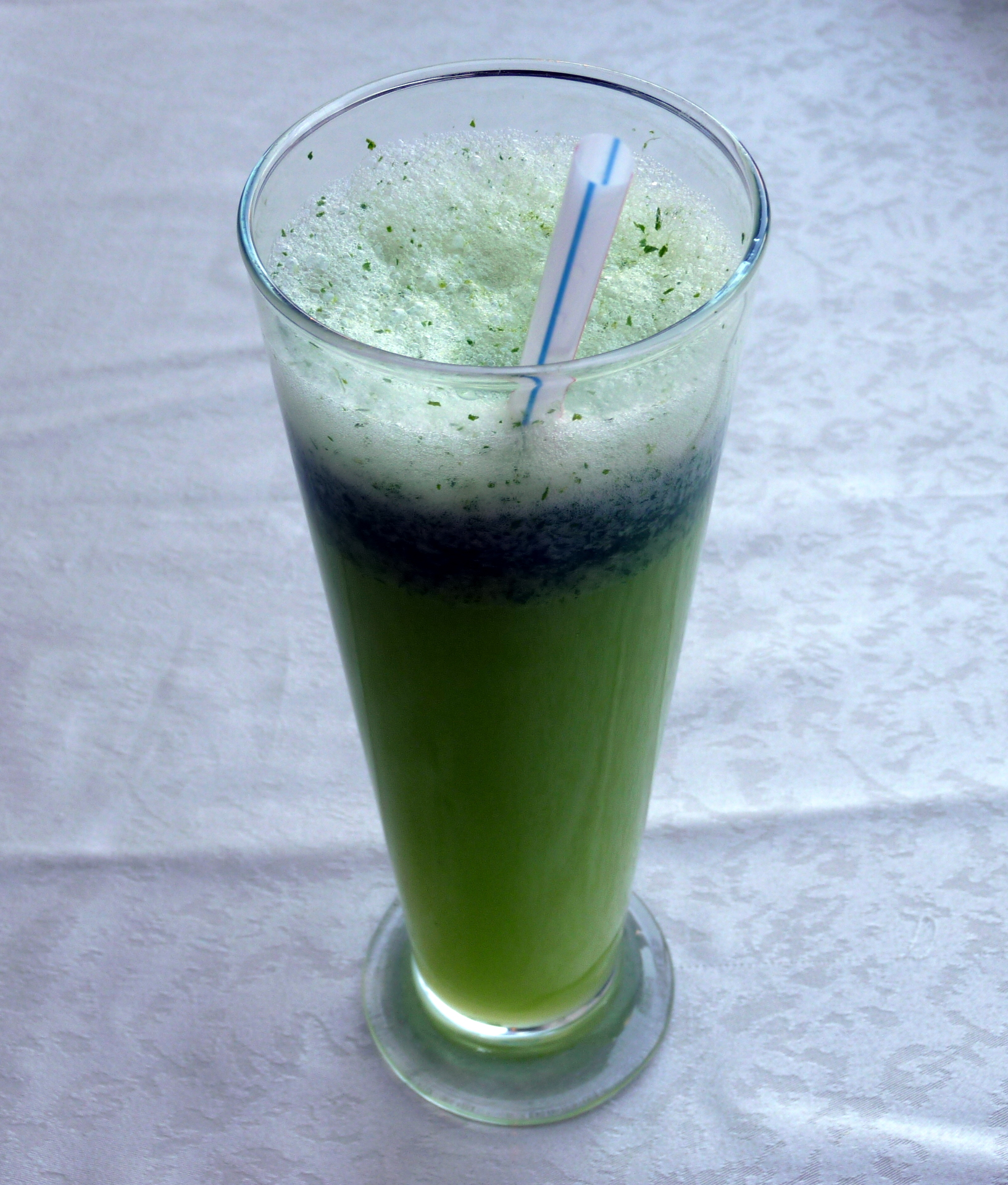
Limonana (mint lemonade) served in Damascus, Syria

The leaf, fresh or dried, is the culinary source of mint. Fresh mint is usually preferred over dried mint when storage of the mint is not a problem. The leaves have a warm, fresh, aromatic, sweet flavor with a cool aftertaste, and are used in teas, syrups, candies, ice creams, sweet foods, beverages, jellies and sauces. In Middle Eastern cuisine, mint is used in lamb dishes, while in British cuisine and American cuisine, mint sauce and mint jelly are used, respectively. Mint (pudina) is a staple in Indian cuisine, used for flavouring curries and other dishes.

Mint is a necessary ingredient in Touareg tea, a popular tea in northern African and Arab countries. Alcoholic drinks sometimes feature mint for flavor or garnish, such as the mint julep and the mojito. Crème de menthe is a mint-flavored liqueur used in drinks such as the grasshopper.

Mint essential oil and menthol are extensively used as flavorings in breath fresheners, drinks, antiseptic mouth rinses, toothpaste, chewing gum, desserts, mint candy, and mint chocolate. The substances that give the mints their characteristic aromas and flavors are menthol (the main aroma of peppermint and Japanese peppermint) and pulegone (in pennyroyal and Corsican mint). The compound primarily responsible for the aroma and flavor of spearmint is L-carvone.

=== Traditional medicine and cosmetics ===
The ancient Greeks rubbed mint on their arms, believing it would make them stronger. Mint was originally used as a medicinal herb to treat stomach ache and chest pains. There are several uses in traditional medicine and preliminary research for possible use of peppermint in treating irritable bowel syndrome.

Menthol from mint essential oil (40–90%) is an ingredient of many cosmetics and some perfumes. Menthol and mint essential oil are also used in aromatherapy which may have clinical use to alleviate post-surgery nausea.

==== Allergic reaction ====
Although it is used in many consumer products, mint may cause allergic reactions in some people, inducing symptoms such as abdominal cramps, diarrhea, headaches, heartburn, tingling or numbing around the mouth, anaphylaxis, or contact dermatitis.

=== Insecticides ===
Mint oil is also used as an environmentally friendly insecticide for its ability to kill some common pests such as wasps, hornets, ants, and cockroaches.

=== Room scent and aromatherapy ===
Known in Greek mythology as the herb of hospitality, one of mint's first known uses in Europe was as a room deodorizer. The herb was strewn across floors to cover the smell of the hard-packed soil. Stepping on the mint helped to spread its scent through the room. Today, it is more commonly used for aromatherapy through the use of essential oils.
