= Jean Gattefossé =

French botanist and chemist

- Born: February 26, 1899; Lyon, France
- Died: June 4, 1960 (aged 61); Casablanca, Morocco
- Citizenship: French
- Education: University of Lyon (1918)
- Known for: Botany of Morocco
- Scientific career
- Fields: Botany
- Author abbrev. (botany): Gattef.

Jean Gattefossé (February 26, 1899 – June 4, 1960) was a French chemist, botanist, journalist and industrialist.

== Biography ==
=== Perfume industry ===
Gattefossé graduated from the University of Lyon as a chemical engineer in 1918. From 1919 to 1920, he was sent by his brother René-Maurice Gattefossé to the French Protectorate in Morocco to study and find potential source plants for essential oils for the family's perfume business, Société Française des Produits Aromatiques, anciens établissements Gattefossé (French Aromatic Products Company). During this time he collaborated with botanist Émile Jahandiez. It was during this period that he first worked with René Maire, with whom he would continuously collaborate afterward. In 1921, he published Voyage d’études au Maroc, a narrative describing this first excursion in Morocco.

Through his work with SFPA, Gattefossé arranged the importation from around the world of exotic essential oils to the company's large Villeurbanne factory complex. Together with his brother, in 1922 he published Les nouveaux parfums synthétiques (New synthetic perfumes), one of the first works on the subject. He became the Editor-in-Chief of La Parfumerie Moderne, a perfume industry magazine founded by the company.

=== Morocco ===
In 1927, he returned to Morocco, where he would continue to reside for the rest of his life. He established industrial botanical gardens there, and continued to research herbal traditional medicines. From 1931 to 1933, he conducted a survey of the Atlas Mountains.

During this time, he and Maire described a number of species together including:

- Leucojum trichophyllum var. micranthum Gattef. & Maire (1939)
- Linaria × polychroa Gattef. & Maire (1940)
- Chrysanthemum × schousboeanum Gattef. & Maire (1941)
- Lavandula × christiana Gattef. & Maire (1947)
- Senecio × hintermannii Gattef. & Maire (1940)

Gattefossé also assisted in the collection of specimens for a number of other species described by others (including Maire), such as Sedum mucizonia, Gelidium pusillum, Gigartina pistillata, Malope rhodoleuca.

He died of a heart attack in Casablanca on June 4, 1960.

== Legacy ==
Gattefossé had a number of species named in his honor, with the binomial gattefossei, including:

- Centaurea gattefossei Maire
- Mentha gattefossei Maire
- Linaria gattefossei Maire & Weiller

== Published works ==
- Gattefossé, J. 1921. Voyage d'études au Maroc. 37 pp.
- Gattefossé, J. C. Roux. 1926. Bibliographie de l'Atlantide et des questions connexes (géographie, ethnographie et migrations anciennes, Atlantique et Méditerranée, Afrique et Amérique, fixité ou dérive des continents, déluges, traditions, etc.) Avec 15 planches de cartes et croquis .... Ed. Imprimerie Bosc frères & Riou (Lyon). 111 pp.
- Gattefossé, J. 1934. Les greniers de falaises forme ancienne d'Agadir collectif. Bulletin de la Société de Préhistoire du Maroc.
- Gattefossé, J. 1938a. L'Aromatherapie
- 1938b. L'Exportation marocaine : [avec une préface du général Noguès et la collaboration pour les textes de M. Billet, R. Dupré, Henri Coursier, R. Jean, Dr Eyraud, M. Boudy, P. Ricard, C. Fradin, Jean Gattefosse]. 1.964 láminas
- Gattefossé, J. 1943. Matières premières végétales marocaines : Flore spontanée
- Sauveclare, J de; J Gattefosse. 1946. Les Portes de bronze.
- Sauvage, C; J Gattefossé. 1954. Maroc .
