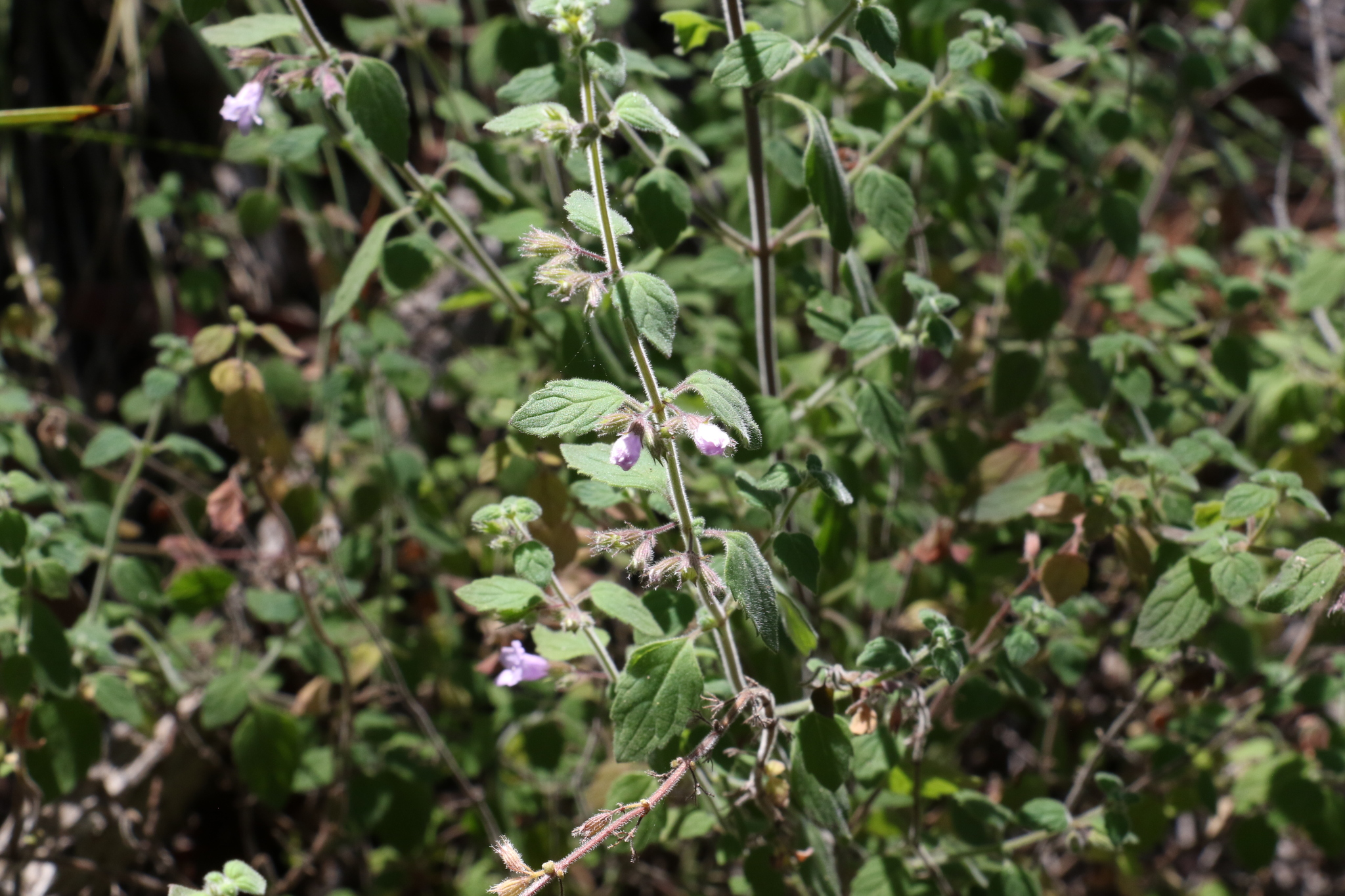

Conservation status
- Least Concern (NCA)

Scientific classification
- Kingdom: Plantae
- Clade: Embryophytes
- Clade: Tracheophytes
- Clade: Spermatophytes
- Clade: Angiosperms
- Clade: Eudicots
- Clade: Asterids
- Order: Lamiales
- Family: Lamiaceae
- Genus: Mentha
- Species: M. grandiflora

Binomial name
- Mentha grandiflora Benth.

= Mentha grandiflora =

Species of mint

Mentha grandiflora is a plant species in the genus Mentha, endemic to eastern Australia. The species was described in 1848 by botanist George Bentham. Its epithet, grandiflora, means "with large flowers".

== Taxonomy ==
Mentha grandiflora is generally accepted as a distinct species by taxonomy authorities, and along with Mentha pulegium and Mentha requienii, it is considered to belong to the section Pulegium within the Mentha genus. These three species have been proposed to be monophyletic, but this has not been confirmed due to lack of study of M. grandiflora.

M. grandiflora may also be categorized as among the species of mint whose primary monoterpene compound is menthol (rather than carvone or linalool).

== Description ==
Mentha grandiflora is a small herb with "pale lilac-purple" flowers and a pronounced pennyroyal scent.

An analysis of the leaf essential oil components of M. grandiflora were first published in 1997, and found its primary constituents were: piperitenone oxide (36.2%), trans-piperitone oxide (21.4%), pulegone (19.1%), menthone (9.7%), d-Limonene (3.5%), bicyclogermacrene (2.1%), piperitenone (1.7%). Its high quantities of piperitenone oxide & trans-piperitone oxide differentiate it from the other endemic Australian species. This is the only known study of the essential oil of this species.

== Distribution ==
Mentha grandiflora is endemic to regions of sandy soil in eastern Australia, from Queensland to northern New South Wales. Its distribution within this range has been described as "highly disjunct" however.

== Use ==
Mentha grandiflora is considered unsuitable for food use. The report of the 1861 Victorian Exhibition, held in Melbourne, opined that "this mint has a fiery, bitter, and very unpleasant nauseous taste" such that "it could not be used as a substitute for common peppermint, except for medical purposes."
