= Mentha royleana =

Scientific classification
- Kingdom: Plantae
- Clade: Tracheophytes
- Clade: Angiosperms
- Clade: Eudicots
- Clade: Asterids
- Order: Lamiales
- Family: Lamiaceae
- Genus: Mentha
- Species: M. royleana

Binomial name
- Mentha royleana Benth.

Synonyms
- Mentha longifolia subsp. royleana Col.; Mentha sylvestris var. royleana Benth.

Species of mint

Mentha royleana, is a species within the Mentha (mint) genus, native to eastern Afghanistan, Pakistan, the Himalayas and Kashmir. A polymorphic perennial herb, M. royleana has seen diverse uses in traditional medicine.

== Name ==
Mentha royleana is known by the English common name of Royle's mint, named for British botanist John Forbes Royle. In Pakistan, it is referred to as Jangli podina or simply podina or pudina. Other attested regional names include:

- Kala podna
- Nari Wailani (Pashto)
- Safaid podina (Hindko)
- Pahari pudina
- Tulasi paate
- Valenay (Miandam area)
- Venalay

== Description ==
Mentha royleana resembles other Mentha species, in particular Mentha longifolia. Like other mints, M. royleana is a perennial plant, reproducing via rhizome, and shares the pungent mint aroma of most of the genus.

It is distinguished from its close relatives by its narrowly oblong-elliptic mostly petiolate leaves, which tend to be discolored. Other authors attest the leaves can occasionally be sessile. Its spikes are more slender, with separated verticillasters and calyces measuring 1.5 to 2 millimeters. Its flowers are small and whitish in color. According to a 2011 study, M. royleana contains a mean 179.2 milligrams of caffeic acid, 46.93 milligrams of rosmarinic acid, 41.76 milligrams of ferulic acid per 100 grams of plant material.

== Classification ==
The Mentha species in general demonstrate a large amount of genetic variation and ease of hybridization, which has made taxonomic distinctions a fraught question. In a 2018 analysis, samples of M. royleana from different geographic regions of Pakistan demonstrated the greatest amount of genetic variability among the studied Mentha species. As a result, several varieties have been defined. A 1992 study identified two varieties: var. glabra and var. gilgitica. Botanist Karl Heinz Rechinger recognized three varieties in 1998: var. royleana, var. detonsa (Briquet) and var. afghanica (Murata). A 2018 comparison of random amplification of polymorphic DNA markers differentiated three varieties of M. royleana: var. afghanica, var. royleana, and var. tugidus.

The similarity of M. royleana to other mints has led some authors to even assign it as a mere varietal of M. longifolia. However, it is currently accepted as a distinct species by authorities such as Plants of the World Online. Studies of populations of M. royleana and M. spicata determined they were genetically distinct enough to justify their separate species classifications. Recent literature continues to call for further investigation to establish M. royleana's true taxonomic status.

== Distribution and habitat ==
While Mentha royleana's native distribution is in the region of the Himalayas (including India, Pakistan and Nepal), it is now established throughout Northwest Asia and Europe. It has also been intentionally cultivated in parts of China. It is frequent in wet places, principally at elevations from 9000 to 11000 feet (11,000 or 12,000 feet in another source). Some authors have described it as common, or indeed even "the commonest mint" in Pakistan.

== Use ==
Mentha royleana has been assessed as a plant with a "high use value" in traditional medicine. It has been used to treat a variety of ailments. It is said to be used as a treatment for vomiting, diarrhea, dysentary, and cholera, as well as a general carminative.

In the Margalla Hills, part of the Himalayan foothills, it is ground with the fruit of Zanthoxylum armatum and combined with salt as a stomach ache cure. Herbal medicine practitioners in Batakundi mixes the leaves of M. royleana into green teas, with cooling and gas relief properties. In Parachinar, the leaves of the plant are sewed into cloth pads and wrapped around babies' chests to relieve flus and chest problems. In the Haramosh valley in Gilgit District, M. royleana is combined with pomegranate, ginger and garlic to produce a juice intended to treat diabetes and heart issues. Combined with Thymus linearis (Himalayan Thyme), it is used to treat high blood pressure and abdominal worms.

Aside from medical use, M. royleana is used to freshen the breath and in the preparation of sauces and salads. The floral shoots of M. royleana are also used in religious ceremonies in Hinduism.
