= Mentha choujunensis =

Scientific classification
- Kingdom: Plantae
- Clade: Tracheophytes
- Clade: Angiosperms
- Clade: Eudicots
- Clade: Asterids
- Order: Lamiales
- Family: Lamiaceae
- Genus: Mentha
- Species: M. choujunensis

Binomial name
- Mentha choujunensis A.H.Ganie, T.Islam & Khuroo

Species of plant

Mentha choujunensis has been identified in 2024. It is found in Ladakh, India.
