= Mentha dahurica =

Dahurian thyme

Scientific classification
- Kingdom: Plantae
- Clade: Tracheophytes
- Clade: Angiosperms
- Clade: Eudicots
- Clade: Asterids
- Order: Lamiales
- Family: Lamiaceae
- Genus: Mentha
- Species: M. dahurica

Binomial name
- Mentha dahurica Fischer ex Bentham

Species of flowering plant

Mentha dahurica, or Dahurian thyme, is a mint species within the genus Mentha, native to Siberia, the Russian Far East, Japan, and northeastern China.

The epithet honors the Daur people of Inner Mongolia.
