= Mentha laxiflora =

Forest mint

Scientific classification
- Kingdom: Plantae
- Clade: Tracheophytes
- Clade: Angiosperms
- Clade: Eudicots
- Clade: Asterids
- Order: Lamiales
- Family: Lamiaceae
- Genus: Mentha
- Species: M. laxiflora

Binomial name
- Mentha laxiflora Bentham

Species of flowering plant

Mentha laxiflora, commonly known as the forest mint, is native to shady, moist or swampy areas, such as the woodland in eastern Australia (Victoria, New South Wales and the Australian Capital Territory). It is part of the Lamiaceae family.

This plant usually flowers from September to March and has a usual size of 15–40 cm × 1 m. The flowering is present with 4–8 lobed flowers on short stalks that are mauve pink to white. It grows in damp soils in mountain forests and is used by Aborigines for medicines.
