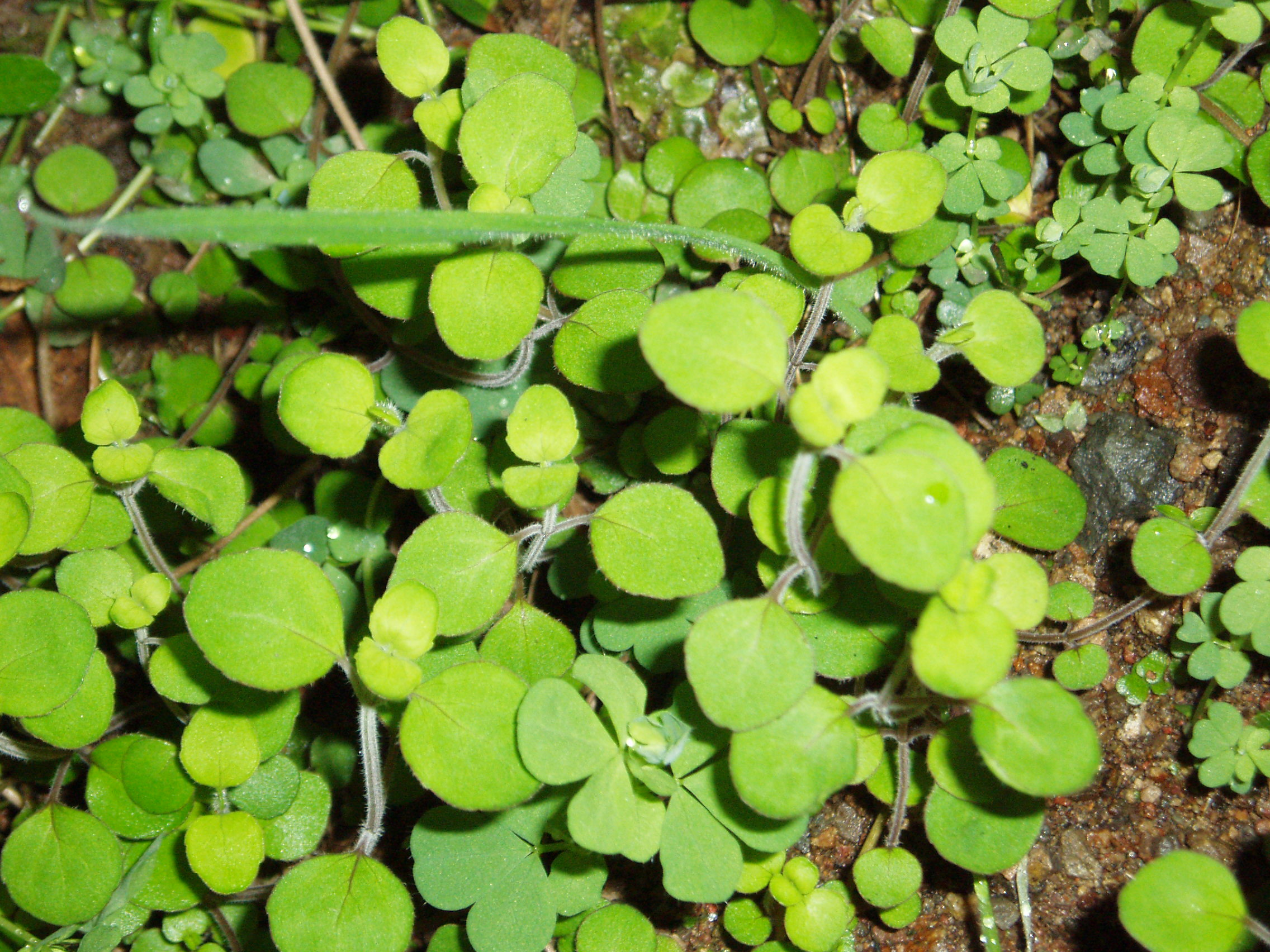

Conservation status
- Declining (NZ TCS)

Scientific classification
- Kingdom: Plantae
- Clade: Tracheophytes
- Clade: Angiosperms
- Clade: Eudicots
- Clade: Asterids
- Order: Lamiales
- Family: Lamiaceae
- Genus: Mentha
- Species: M. cunninghamii

Binomial name
- Mentha cunninghamii Benth.

Synonyms
- Mentha consimilis Col.; Micromeria cunninghamii Benth.

= Mentha cunninghamii =

New Zealand mint, Māori mint

Species of mint

Mentha cunninghamii, known commonly as New Zealand mint or Māori mint, is a species within the Mentha (mint) genus, endemic to New Zealand.

== Name ==
The plant was named to honor English botanist Allan Cunningham, who was known for his plant collections in Australia and New Zealand. In addition to its English-language names, several Māori language common names for the plant are also attested, including: hīoi, moki and mokimoki. The latter is a term also used for the unrelated ferns Microsorum scandens and Doodia caudata.

== Description ==
Mentha cunninghamii shares a mint odor with other species within the Mentha (mint) genus, but in appearance is very distinct from many other mints. It has been suggested that it may actually be more closely related to members of the Micromeria genus.

It is a slender, wiry, prostrate perennial plant, with a creeping rhizome. The plant is much branched, often matted, with numerous stems arising from the rhizome, diffusely branched, pubescent, growing from two to twelve inches long. Its leaves are shortly petiolate or nearly sessile, 1/6 to 1/2 inches long, broadly ovate or almost orbicular, obtuse, entire or with an obscure notch on each side, and glandular-dotted. Its flowers are small, white, axillary, usually solitary but sometimes with two to three in each axil. Its peduncles are slender and variable in length. Its calyx are about 1/8 inches long, tubular-campanulate in shape, densely hairy, with teeth villous within. Its corolla-lobes are almost equal, flat and spreading, with the upper one shortly bifid. Its stamens protrude equally with the corolla or are slightly exserted.

== Distribution ==
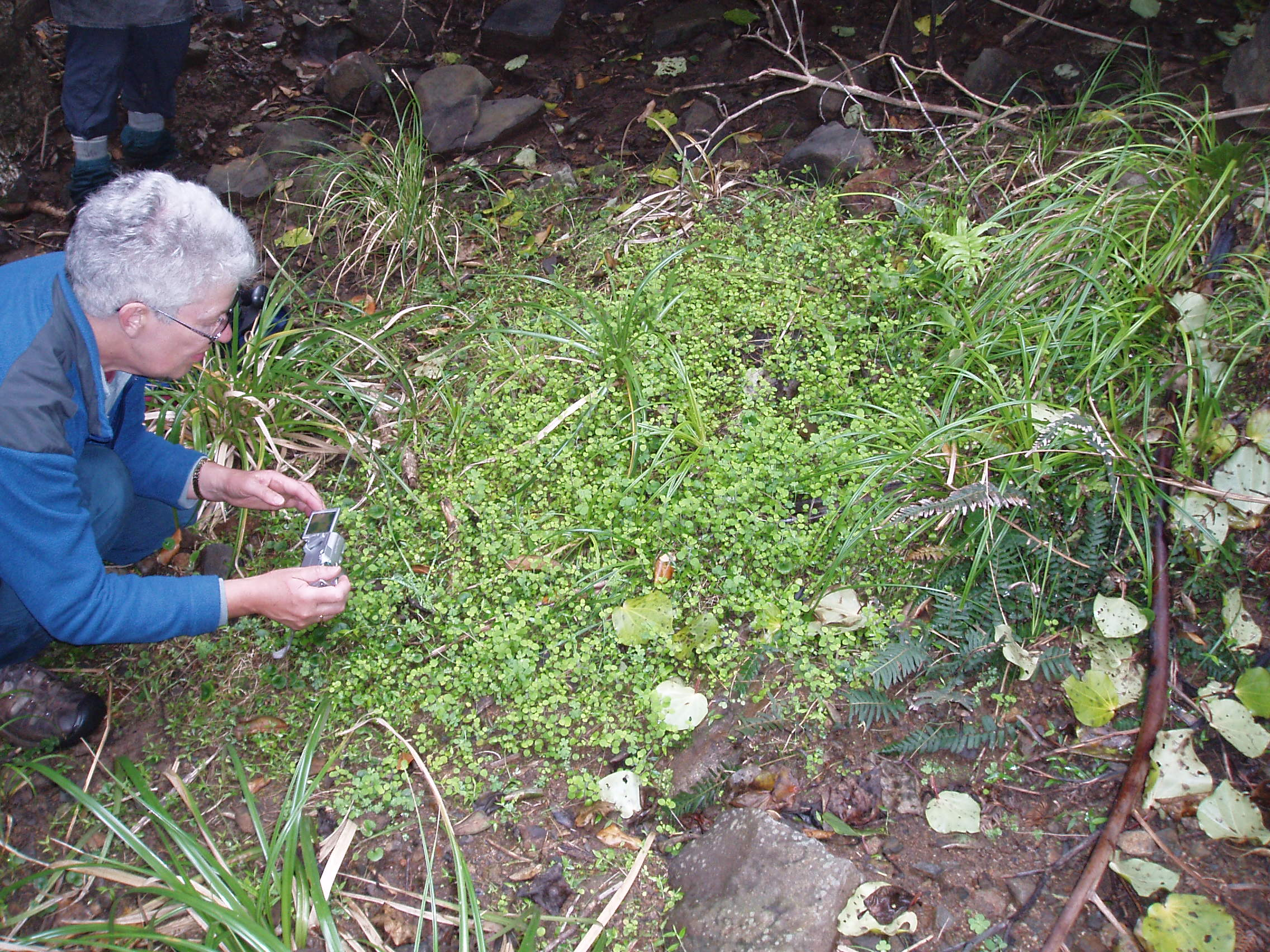
Mentha cunninghamii observed in situ within Waitakere Ecological District, Auckland

Mentha cunninghamii is endemic to the four islands of North Island, South Island, Chatham Island and Stewart Island in New Zealand. It is found sparsely in grassy fields and open land generally. It inhabits an elevation range from coastal to alpine, within a range of sea level to 4,500 feet (1,400 metres). Sources variously describe its flowering season as beginning in the Southern Hemisphere in either September or November, ending in April.

As of 2018, New Zealand's Department of Conservation New Zealand Threat Classification System (NZTCS) assesses Mentha cunninghamii's conservation status as "At Risk: Declining." The system uses the Declining status to indicate populations that currently possess large populations, but are experiencing declines that could eventually lead to a listing as "Threatened."

== Use ==
Mentha cunninghamii has been used by New Zealand's Māori people as a diaphoretic (meant to induce sweating). The leaves are also used for their scent, including in cooking. It is described as easily cultivable in many gardens.
