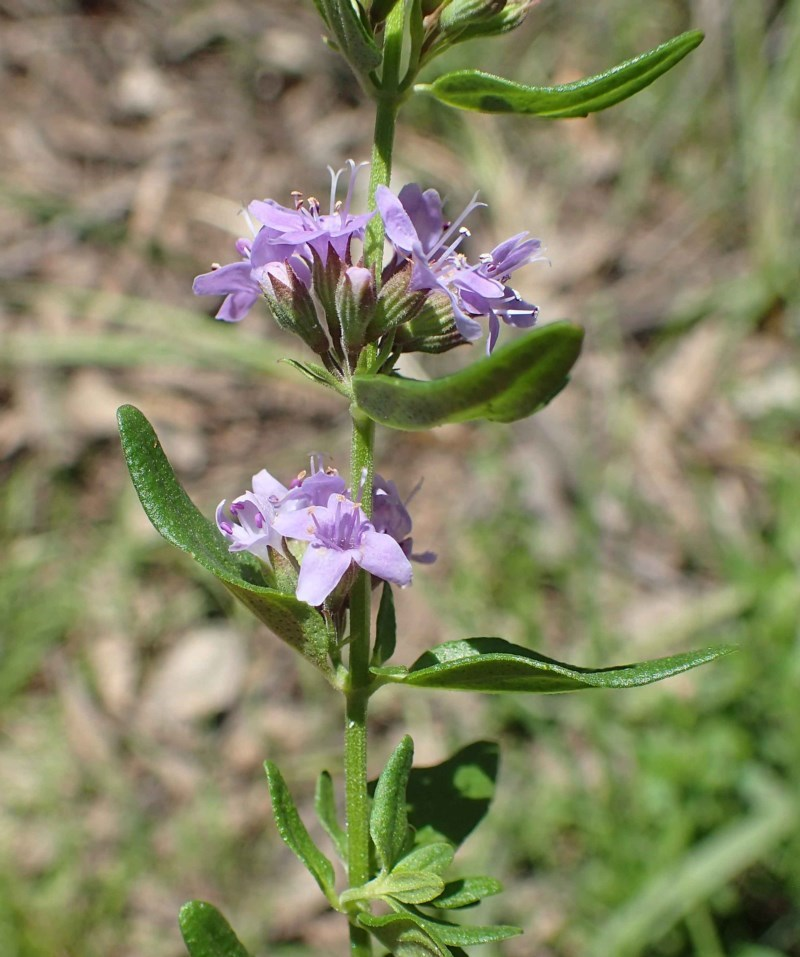

Scientific classification
- Kingdom: Plantae
- Clade: Tracheophytes
- Clade: Angiosperms
- Clade: Eudicots
- Clade: Asterids
- Order: Lamiales
- Family: Lamiaceae
- Genus: Mentha
- Species: M. diemenica

Binomial name
- Mentha diemenica Sprengel

= Mentha diemenica =

Slender mint

Species of flowering plant

Mentha diemenica, commonly known as slender mint, is a flowering plant in the Lamiaceae family. It grows in the Northern Territory, Australian Capital Territory and all mainland states except Western Australia. It has mint-scented foliage and clusters of purple flowers.

== Description ==
Mentha diemenica is a small, prostrate, perennial herb with underground spreading stems and leafy, erect, ascending branches to 15 cm (5.9 in) high. The branches are covered with occasional to thickly recurved hairs. The leaves are arranged in opposite pairs, aromatic, mostly oval-shaped, 6–20 mm (0.24–0.79 in) long, 4–12 mm (0.16–0.47 in) wide, lower surface has short, upright, scattered hairs, margins entire or sparsely toothed, apex rounded or almost pointed and the petiole 0–3 mm (0.00–0.12 in) long. The purple or rarely white flowers are usually borne in clusters of 3-8 at the end of branches in the leaf axil, lobes pointed or widely pointed, outer surface thickly covered with short hairs and long hairs on the margin. The corolla is 4–7 mm (0.16–0.28 in) long with four petals extending 2–3 mm (0.079–0.118 in) beyond the ribbed calyx tube that is covered in spreading hairs. Flowering occurs from late spring to summer and the fruit is a mericarp, obovoid-shaped, dry, segmented and about 1 mm (0.039 in) long.

== Taxonomy and naming ==
Mentha diemenica was first formally described in 1825 by Carl Sprengel and the description was published in Systema Vegetabilium. The specific epithet (diemenica) is in reference to Van Diemen's Land the former name of Tasmania.

== Distribution and habitat ==
Slender mint grows in damp locations, clay to sandy soils in montane woodland and grassland. It is found in all states of Australia with the exception of Western Australia.

== See also ==
- List of Australian herbs and spices
