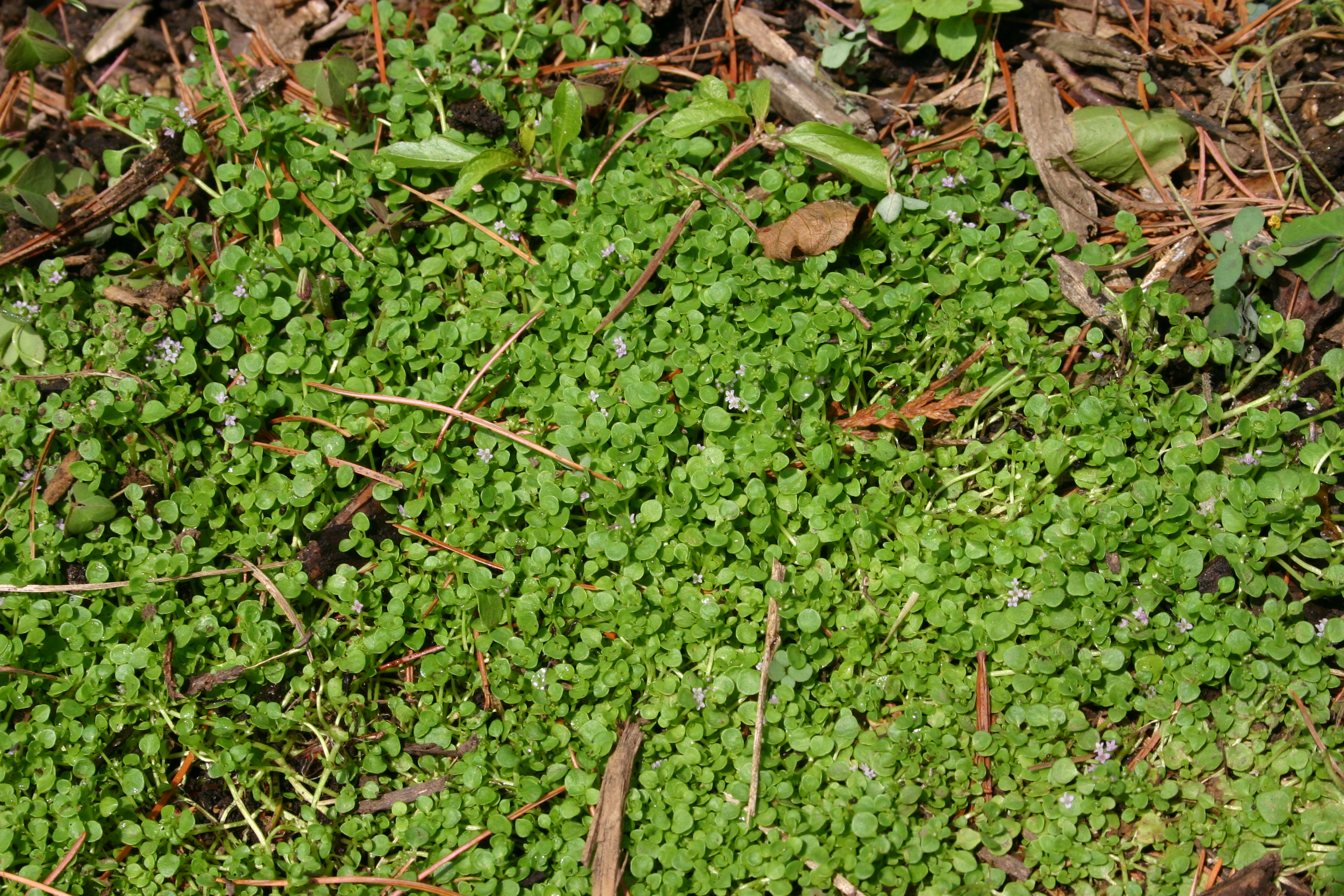

Conservation status
- Least Concern (IUCN 3.1)

Scientific classification
- Kingdom: Plantae
- Clade: Tracheophytes
- Clade: Angiosperms
- Clade: Eudicots
- Clade: Asterids
- Order: Lamiales
- Family: Lamiaceae
- Genus: Mentha
- Species: M. requienii

Binomial name
- Mentha requienii Bentham

= Mentha requienii =

Corsican mint

Species of flowering plant

Mentha requienii, or Corsican mint, is an herb and species of mint, native to Corsica, Sardinia, and Montecristo Island, and naturalized in Portugal and in the British Isles. It is a very low-growing species with bright green leaves and a strong minty aroma.

== Description ==
Corsican mint is one of the smallest members of the mint family. It grows to 3–10 cm tall, with small oval leaves 2–7 mm long and tiny mauve flowers in July and August that are insect-pollinated. It has a strong aroma of peppermint.

== Distribution ==
Corsican mint is native to Corsica, Sardinia and the Montecristo island. It has become naturalised in other parts of the world and is regarded as an invasive species in south eastern United States.

== Use in the garden ==
Mentha requienii can be used in landscaping as a bedding plant, giving out a desirable mint smell when trodden on. Because it can indeed be walked upon without dying, it is sometimes used to line walkways, growing between stepping stones. Unlike most other cultivated mints, this plant stays diminutive and thrives in shady garden areas. However, if given too much moisture the leaves will rot. The best way to avoid this is to let the plant dry out between waterings, but not too much, because it is drought-sensitive. Baby's tears is used as a substitute in areas where Corsican mint is too fragile.

== Use in the kitchen ==
This plant is also used in cuisine, most famously as the flavoring in crème de menthe. It is sometimes said to have a scent similar to pennyroyal.

== Other uses ==
In traditional medicine this plant has been used as an antiseptic, a carminative and a febrifuge. The smell of mint is disliked by rats and mice and this plant has been used for strewing on the floor to deter rodents.
