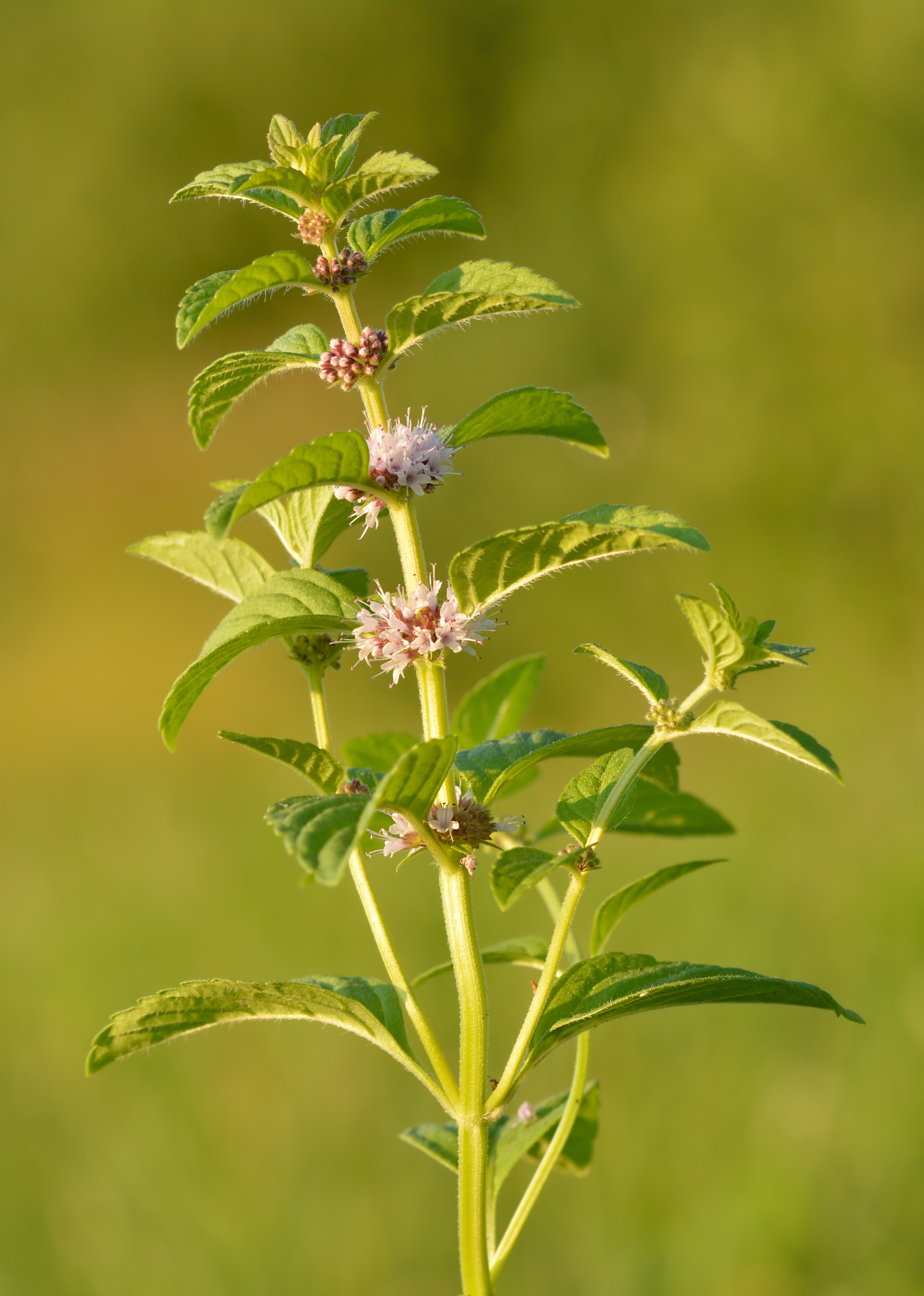

Conservation status
- Least Concern (IUCN 3.1)

Scientific classification
- Kingdom: Plantae
- Clade: Embryophytes
- Clade: Tracheophytes
- Clade: Angiosperms
- Clade: Eudicots
- Clade: Asterids
- Order: Lamiales
- Family: Lamiaceae
- Genus: Mentha
- Species: M. arvensis

Binomial name
- Mentha arvensis L.

Synonyms
- List: Calamintha arvensis (L.) Garsault; Mentha agrestis Sole; Mentha agrestis Hegetschw.; Mentha agrestris Sole; Mentha albae-carolinae Heinr.Braun; Mentha alberti Sennen; Mentha allionii Boreau; Mentha angustifolia Schreb.; Mentha anomala Hérib.; Mentha approximata (Wirtg.) Strail; Mentha arenaria Topitz; Mentha arguta Opiz; Mentha argutissima Borbás & Heinr.Braun; Mentha argutissima var. subpilosa Topitz; Mentha arvensis var. caespitosa Boenn.; Mentha arvensis var. lanceolata Becker; Mentha arvensis var. legitima Becker; Mentha arvensis var. minor Becker; Mentha arvensis var. parietariifolia Becker; Mentha arvensis subsp. parietariifolia (Becker) Briq.; Mentha arvensis var. parviflora Boenn.; Mentha arvensis var. procumbens Becker; Mentha arvensis var. radicans Boenn.; Mentha atrovirens Host; Mentha austriaca Jacq.; Mentha badensis J.Fellm. ex Ledeb.; Mentha badensis C.C.Gmel.; Mentha baguetiana Strail; Mentha barbata Opiz ex Déségl.; Mentha bracteolata Opiz ex Déségl.; Mentha campestris Schur; Mentha campicola Heinr.Braun; Mentha collina Topitz; Mentha cuneifolia (Lej.) Domin; Mentha deflexa Dumort.; Mentha densiflora Opiz; Mentha densifoliata Strail; Mentha diffusa Lej.; Mentha dissitiflora Sennen; Mentha divaricata Host; Mentha divergens Topitz; Mentha dubia Schleich. ex Suter; Mentha duffourii Sennen; Mentha duftschmidii (Topitz) Trautm.; Mentha duftschmidii Topitz; Mentha ehrhartiana Lej. & Courtois; Mentha exigua Lucé; Mentha flagellifera Schur; Mentha flexuosa Strail; Mentha florida Tausch ex Heinr.Braun; Mentha fochii Sennen; Mentha fontana Weihe ex Strail; Mentha fontana var. brevibracteata Topitz & Heinr.Braun; Mentha fontana var. conferta Topitz; Mentha fontqueri Sennen; Mentha fossicola Heinr.Braun; Mentha gallica (Topitz) Domin; Mentha gentiliformis Strail; Mentha gentilis Georgi; Mentha gracilescens Opiz ex Strail; Mentha graveolens Opiz; Mentha hillebrandtii Ortmann ex Malinv.; Mentha hostii Boreau; Mentha hostii var. arvina Topitz; Mentha intermedia Nees ex Bluff & Fingerh.; Mentha joffrei Sennen; Mentha kitaibeliana Heinr.Braun ex Haring; Mentha lamiifolia Host; Mentha lanceolata Benth.; Mentha lapponica Wahlenb.; Mentha lata Opiz ex Déségl.; Mentha latifolia Host; Mentha latissima Schur; Mentha laxa Host; Mentha longibracteata Heinr.Braun; Mentha maculata Host; Mentha melissifolia Host; Mentha minor Opiz ex Déségl.; Mentha moenchii Pérard; Mentha mosana Lej. & Courtois; Mentha multiflora Host; Mentha multiflora var. serpentina Topitz; Mentha mutabilis (Topitz) Domin; Mentha nemorosa Host; Mentha nemorum Boreau; Mentha nobilis Weihe ex Fingerh.; Mentha nummularia Schreb.; Mentha obtusata Opiz; Mentha obtusodentata (Topitz) Domin; Mentha ocymoides Host; Mentha odorata Opiz ex Déségl.; Mentha origanifolia Host; Mentha ovata Schur; Mentha palitzensis Topitz; Mentha paludosa Nees ex Bluff & Fingerh.; Mentha palustris Moench; Mentha parvifolia Opiz; Mentha parvula Topitz; Mentha pascuorum (Topitz) Trautm.; Mentha pastoris Sennen; Mentha piersiana Borbás; Mentha pilosa Spreng. ex Wallr.; Mentha pilosella Pérard; Mentha plagensis Topitz; Mentha plicata Opiz; Mentha polymorpha Host; Mentha praeclara Topitz; Mentha praecox Sole; Mentha praticola Opiz; Mentha procumbens Thuill.; Mentha prostrata Host; Mentha pulchella Host; Mentha pulegiformis Heinr.Braun; Mentha pumila Host; Mentha rigida Strail; Mentha rothii Nees ex Bluff & Fingerh.; Mentha rotundata Opiz; Mentha ruderalis Topitz; Mentha salebrosa Boreau; Mentha sativa Roxb.; Mentha schreberi Pérard; Mentha scrophulariifolia Lej. & Courtois; Mentha segetalis Opiz; Mentha silvicola Heinr.Braun; Mentha simplex Host; Mentha slichoviensis Opiz; Mentha sparsiflora Heinr.Braun; Mentha sparsiflora var. pascuorum Topitz; Mentha subcollina Topitz; Mentha subcordata Colla ex Lamotte; Mentha subfontanea Topitz; Mentha subinodora Schur; Mentha sylvatica Host; Mentha tenuicaulis Strail; Mentha tenuifolia Host; Mentha thayana Heinr.Braun; Mentha uliginosa Strail; Mentha vanhaesendonckii Strail; Mentha varians Host; Mentha verisimilis Strail; Mentha villosa Becker; Mentha viridula Host

= Mentha arvensis =

Species of flowering plant

Mentha arvensis, the corn mint, field mint, or wild mint, is a species of flowering plant in the mint family Lamiaceae. It has a circumboreal distribution, being native to the temperate regions of Europe and western and central Asia, east to the Himalaya and eastern Siberia, and North America. Mentha canadensis, the related species, is also included in Mentha arvensis by some authors as two varieties, M. arvensis var. glabrata Fernald (North American plants such as American wild mint) and M. arvensis var. piperascens Malinv. ex L. H. Bailey (eastern Asian plants such as Japanese mint).

It grows in moist places, especially along streams.

== Description ==
Wild mint is a herbaceous perennial plant generally growing to 10–60 cm (4–24 in) and rarely up to 100 cm (40 in) tall. It has a creeping rootstock from which grow erect or semi-sprawling squarish stems.

The leaves are in opposite pairs, simple, 2–6.5 cm (3/4–2 1/2 in) long and 1–2 cm (1/2–3/4 in) broad, hairy, and with a coarsely serrated margin.

The flowers are pale purple (occasionally white or pink), in whorls on the stem at the bases of the leaves. Each flower is 3 to 4 mm (1/8 to 5/32 in) long and has a five-lobed hairy calyx, a four-lobed corolla with the uppermost lobe larger than the others and four stamens. The fruit is a two-chambered carpel.

== Subspecies ==
Subspecies include:

- Mentha arvensis subsp. arvensis.
- Mentha arvensis subsp. agrestis (Sole) Briq.
- Mentha arvensis subsp. austriaca (Jacq.) Briq.
- Mentha arvensis subsp. lapponica (Wahlenb.) Neuman
- Mentha arvensis subsp. palustris (Moench) Neumann
- Mentha arvensis var. piperascenes Malinv. ex L. H. Bailey – Japanese/Chinese/Korean mint
- Mentha arvensis subsp. parietariifolia (Becker) Briq.
- Mentha arvensis subsp. haplocalyx (Linnaeus, e.g. var. sachalinensis)

The related species Mentha canadensis is also included in M. arvensis by some authors as two varieties, M. arvensis var. glabrata Fernald (in reference to North American plants) and M. arvensis var. piperascens Malinv. ex L. H. Bailey (in reference to eastern Asian plants).

== Uses ==
The leaves have been made into tea to treat colds or aid digestion. They can also be eaten raw.

Chemical substances that can be extracted from wild mint include menthol, menthone, isomenthone, neomenthol, limonene, methyl acetate, piperitone, beta-caryophyllene, alpha-pinene, beta-pinene, tannins and flavonoids. Mint extracts and menthol-related chemicals are used in food, drinks, cough medicines, creams and cigarettes. Menthol is widely used in dental care, as a mouthwash potentially inhibiting streptococci and lactobacilli bacteria.

== Diseases ==
Two main diseases that can significantly damage Japanese mint (M. arvensis var. piperascens) and its yield are the rust fungus and the mildew attacks. Mildew attacks usually only occur on the west coast of United States where the weather can be foggy and humid, a condition that attracts mildew. Rust fungus is a disease that is common for most of the Mentha plants such as peppermint and spearmint. These diseases are flagged due to the improbability of controlling once it starts in a mint farm. They are typically cut immediately when discovered to help reduce the probability of contaminating the rest of the plant leaves.
