= Carminative =

Herb or preparation for the gastrointestinal tract

A carminative, known in Latin as carminativum (plural carminativa), is a herb or preparation intended to combat flatulence either by preventing formation of gas in the gastrointestinal tract or facilitating its expulsion.

== Name ==
The word carminative is a derivative of Latin cārmen "card for wool", according to Hensley Wedgewood, on the humoral theory that carminatives "dilute and relax the gross humours from whence the wind arises, combing them out like the knots in wool".

== Varieties ==
Carminatives are often mixtures of essential oils and spices with a tradition in folk medicine. Some examples include:

- Agasyllis
- Angelica
- Ajwain
- Anise seed
- Asafoetida
- Basil
- Calamus
- Caraway
- Cardamom
- Cinnamon
- Coriander
- Coscoll
- Cnidium monnieri (She Huangzi)
- Cumin
- Dill
- Epazote
- Eucalyptus
- Fennel
- Garlic
- Ginger
- Goldenrod
- Haritaki
- Hops
- Lemon balm
- Liquorice
- Lovage
- Marjoram
- Motherwort
- Muña
- Mustard
- Nigella
- Nutmeg
- Onion
- Orange
- Oregano
- Parsley
- Pepper
- Pennyroyal
- Peppermint
- Rosemary
- Saffron
- Sage
- Triphala
- Savory
- Spearmint
- Thyme
- Valerian
- Wintergreen
- Wormwood

Modern drugs used for the same purpose include simethicone, which simply lowers the surface tension of gas bubbles rather than having physiological effects.

== See also ==
- Antiflatulent
- Flatulence § Management
- Anti-foaming agent
- Dalby's Carminative
