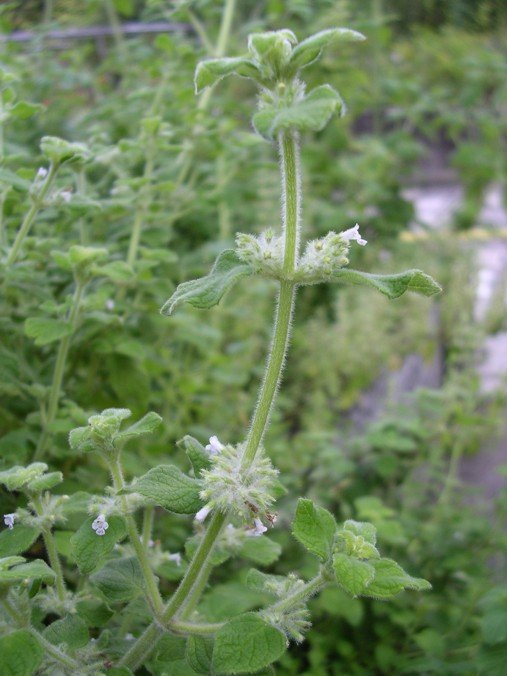
- Minthostachys mollis

Scientific classification
- Kingdom: Plantae
- Clade: Embryophytes
- Clade: Tracheophytes
- Clade: Angiosperms
- Clade: Eudicots
- Clade: Asterids
- Order: Lamiales
- Family: Lamiaceae
- Subfamily: Nepetoideae
- Tribe: Mentheae
- Genus: Minthostachys (Benth.) Spach

= Minthostachys =

Genus of flowering plants

Minthostachys is a genus of the mint family Lamiaceae, comprising aromatic scandent shrubs. It occurs along the Andes from northern Venezuela through Colombia, Ecuador, Peru and Bolivia to central Argentina.

== Use and conservation ==
The plants are valued by the local population for their content in essential oils, mostly pulegone and menthone, but also limonene, carvone, carvacrol, thymol and similar substances. They are used as condiments, medicinally against illnesses of the respiratory and digestive systems, and traditionally for the protection of stored tubers against pests, especially in Southern Peru. In Argentina and Peru, the essential oils are extracted commercially on a larger scale, and at least locally, this has led to overexploitation in recent years. Argentine researchers are looking for ways to protect Minthostachys or to take it into cultivation to meet increasing demand.

== Important species and common names ==
The best known species are Minthostachys mollis distributed from Venezuela to Bolivia and Minthostachys verticillata of Argentina. Many species have a relatively restricted distribution but are locally common, like Minthostachys acutifolia around La Paz and Minthostachys ovata in central Bolivia. The common names used by the people of the Andes usually do not differentiate between species, but vary by region. In Ecuador, the genus is called tipo or poleo, in northern Peru chancua, from central Peru to Bolivia muña, in Bolivia q'oa and in Argentina peperina is the most frequently used name.

== Species ==
Currently recognized species

1. Minthostachys acris Schmidt-Leb. - Peru
2. Minthostachys acutifolia Epling - Bolivia
3. Minthostachys andina (Britton ex Rusby) Epling - La Paz region of Bolivia
4. Minthostachys diffusa Epling - La Paz region of Bolivia
5. Minthostachys dimorpha Schmidt-Leb. - Peru
6. Minthostachys elongata Schmidt-Leb. - Tarija region of Bolivia
7. Minthostachys fusca Schmidt-Leb. - La Paz region of Bolivia
8. Minthostachys glabrescens (Benth.) Epling - Ecuador
9. Minthostachys latifolia Schmidt-Leb. - Peru, Bolivia
10. Minthostachys mollis (Benth.) Griseb. - Venezuela, Colombia, Ecuador, Peru
11. Minthostachys ovata (Briq.) Epling - Bolivia
12. Minthostachys rubra Schmidt-Leb. - Ecuador
13. Minthostachys salicifolia Epling - Peru
14. Minthostachys septentrionalis Schmidt-Leb. - Venezuela, Colombia
15. Minthostachys setosa (Briq.) Epling - Bolivia
16. Minthostachys spicata (Benth.) Epling - Ecuador, Peru
17. Minthostachys verticillata (Griseb.) Epling - Argentina
