= (+)-Menthofuran synthase =

Class of enzymes

Identifiers
- EC no.: 1.14.14.143

Databases
- IntEnz: IntEnz view
- BRENDA: BRENDA entry
- ExPASy: NiceZyme view
- KEGG: KEGG entry
- MetaCyc: metabolic pathway
- PRIAM: profile
- PDB structures: RCSB PDB PDBe PDBsum
Search
- PMC: articles
- PubMed: articles
- NCBI: proteins

(+)-Menthofuran synthase (EC 1.14.14.143, menthofuran synthase, (+)-pulegone 9-hydroxylase, (+)-MFS, cytochrome P450 menthofuran synthase) is an enzyme with systematic name (+)-pulegone,NADPH:oxygen oxidoreductase (9-hydroxylating). This enzyme catalyses the following chemical reaction

pulegone
O_{2}
2 H_{2}O
(+)-menthofuran

The enzyme is a cytochrome P450 protein containing heme, isolated from peppermint. It requires a partner cytochrome P450 reductase for functional expression. This uses nicotinamide adenine dinucleotide phosphate.
