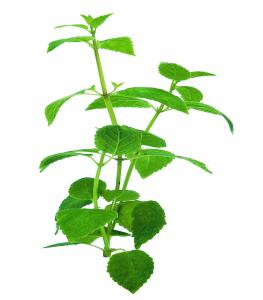

Scientific classification
- Kingdom: Plantae
- Clade: Tracheophytes
- Clade: Angiosperms
- Clade: Eudicots
- Clade: Asterids
- Order: Lamiales
- Family: Lamiaceae
- Genus: Minthostachys
- Species: M. mollis

Binomial name
- Minthostachys mollis (Kunth) Griseb.

= Minthostachys mollis =

Species of flowering plant

Minthostachys mollis is a medicinal plant restricted to the South American Andes from Peru to Bolivia. It is the most variable and widely distributed species of the genus Minthostachys. Its common name muña comes from Quechua. Other local names include tipo, tipollo, poleo.

== Medicinal uses ==
In the indigenous medicine traditions of the Andes, the plant is made into tea and used medicinally as a carminative and aphrodisiac.

== Chemical characteristics ==
The principal components of essential oil are as follows:

- pulegone
- menthone
- menthol
- (−)-β-pinene
- (−)-α-pinene
- limonene
- isomenthone
- piperic acid
- eucalyptol
- carvone

In the flowering tops 19 compounds were identified in the essential oil, predominantly 29% neomenthol, 24% menthone, 20% menthol, and 8% piperitone.
