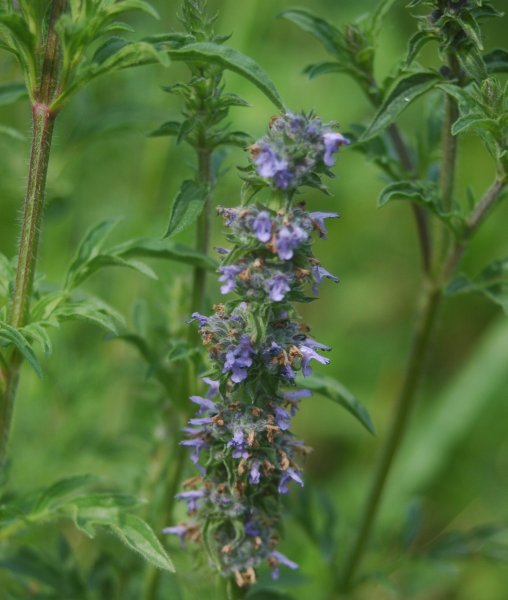

Scientific classification
- Kingdom: Plantae
- Clade: Tracheophytes
- Clade: Angiosperms
- Clade: Eudicots
- Clade: Asterids
- Order: Lamiales
- Family: Lamiaceae
- Subfamily: Nepetoideae
- Tribe: Mentheae
- Genus: Schizonepeta (Benth.) Briq.

= Schizonepeta =

Genus of herbs

Schizonepeta (Japanese catnip) is a genus of herbs. It should not be confused with the true catnips of the genus Nepeta (also Lamiaceae) known for their euphoria-inducing effect on domestic cats.

Used as a medicinal herb, Schizonepeta tenuifolia is cultivated chiefly in the provinces of Jiangsu, Zhejiang and Jiangxi, China. The above-ground parts are collected in autumn, or early winter, and dried in the shade.

Its Chinese name is jingjie (荊芥) pronounced jīngjiè (pinyin). Other names include Herba seu Flos Schizonepetae Tenuifoliae, Japanese keigai, and Korean: 형개; Hanja: 荊芥; RR: hyeonggae; MR: hyŏnggae.

== Extracts ==
In animal studies, Schizonepeta tenuifolia extracts in high doses exhibit immunomodulation of the inflammatory response by regulating cytokine release, specifically the release of Th1 and Th2 cytokines from T cells as well as the unprimed CD4 T cells from differentiating into Th1 and Th2 cells. Schizonepeta also interrupts histamine release from mast cells to inhibit allergic reactions in rats.

== Chemistry ==
Schizonepeta tenuifolia contains the following constituents:

four monoterpenes: (−)-menthone, (+)-pulegone, (−)-limonene and (+)-menthofuran as the main bio-active and toxic constituents.
additional compounds: 1-octen-3-ol, 3-octanone, β-myrcene, and β-caryophyllene.

== See also ==
- Catnip (Nepeta cataria)
