= (−)-Isopiperitenone reductase =

Class of enzymes

(−)-isopiperitenone reductase

Identifiers
- EC no.: 1.3.1.82

Databases
- IntEnz: IntEnz view
- BRENDA: BRENDA entry
- ExPASy: NiceZyme view
- KEGG: KEGG entry
- MetaCyc: metabolic pathway
- PRIAM: profile
- PDB structures: RCSB PDB PDBe PDBsum
Search
- PMC: articles
- PubMed: articles
- NCBI: proteins

(−)-Isopiperitenone reductase (EC 1.3.1.82) is an enzyme with systematic name (+)-cis-isopulegone:NADP^{+} oxidoreductase that is found in peppermint. It catalyses the following chemical reaction:

(-)-isopiperitenone
+ NADPH
H^{+}
H^{+}
(+)-cis-isopulegone
+ NADP^{+}

The three substrates of this enzyme are (-)-isopiperitenone, reduced nicotinamide adenine dinucleotide phosphate (NADPH), and a proton. It converts them to (+)-cis-isopulegone and oxidised NADP^{+}.
