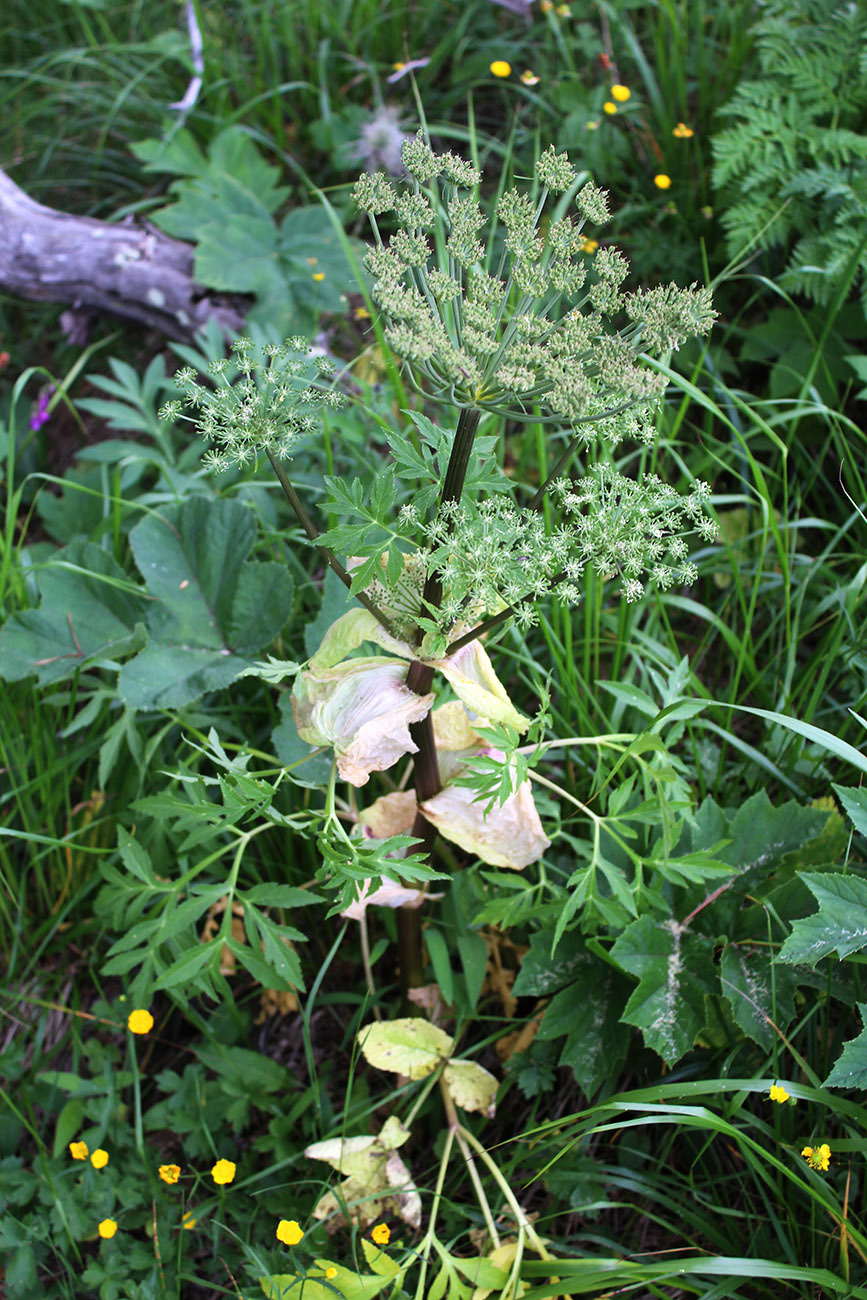
- Agasyllis latifolia

Scientific classification
- Kingdom: Plantae
- Clade: Tracheophytes
- Clade: Angiosperms
- Clade: Eudicots
- Clade: Asterids
- Order: Apiales
- Family: Apiaceae
- Genus: Agasyllis; Spreng.
- Species: A. latifolia

Binomial name
- Agasyllis latifolia (M.Bieb.) Boiss.

Synonyms
- Agasyllis caucasica Spreng., nom. superfl.; Archangelica latifolia (M.Bieb.) Koso-Pol.; Cachrys decursiva Hornem.; Cachrys latifolia M.Bieb.; Chymsydia colchica (Albov) Woronow ex Grossh.; Siler caucasicum Spreng., nom. superfl.; Siler latifolia (M.Bieb.) M.Hiroe

= Agasyllis =

Genus of flowering plants

Agasyllis (Georgian დუცი dootsi) is a monotypic genus of flowering plants belonging to the celery family Apiaceae. The single species, A. latifolia. is endemic to the Caucasus, where it is valued both as a food and a folk medicine.

== Medicinal uses ==
In Western Georgia - notably in Svanetia - A. latifolia is a popular edible and folk-medicinal herb used both in raw and cooked states to treat chronic abdominal pain and helminthiasis (infestation with parasitic worms), while the stem bark of the plant is used to treat asthma and coughs.

== Culinary use in Georgian cuisine ==
Agasyllis latifolia is used in a variety of dishes found in Georgian cuisine. These include khachapuri, the vegetable-and-walnut purées known as mkhali or pkhali and a local speciality called chave prepared from a variety of vegetables combined with meal (coarse flour). The stems are also pickled to make a savoury relish with digestive properties, used as a side dish to accompany other foodstuffs. Svans enjoy eating the young leaves and petioles as an after-dinner snack believed to promote good digestion - a practice that recalls the use of many other aromatic, edible plant species belonging to the family Apiaceae as carminatives (herbs and spices preventing or relieving flatulence).

== Gallery ==
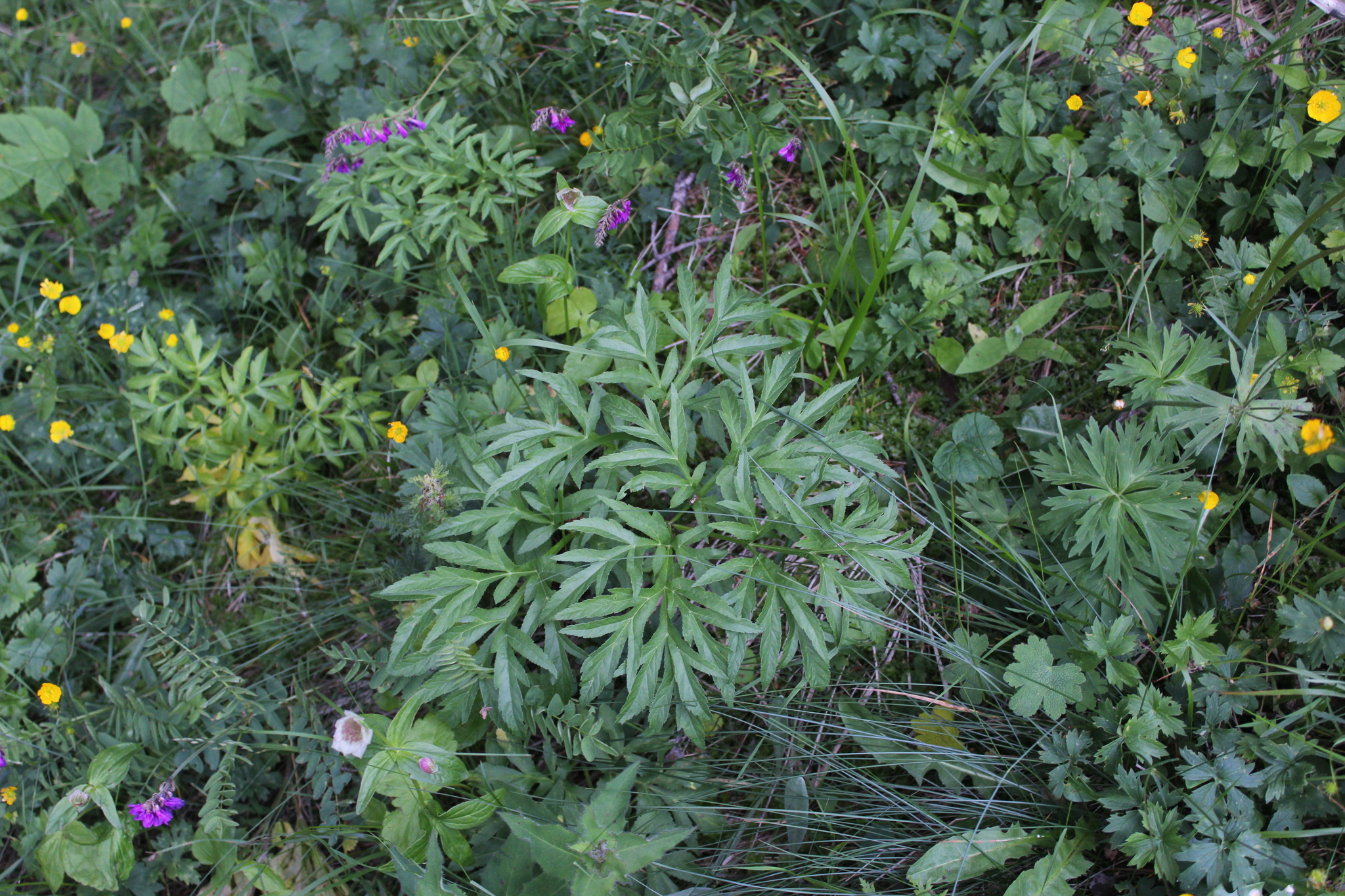
Leaf rosette of specimen growing among Vicia, Ranunculus and Taraxacum spp.

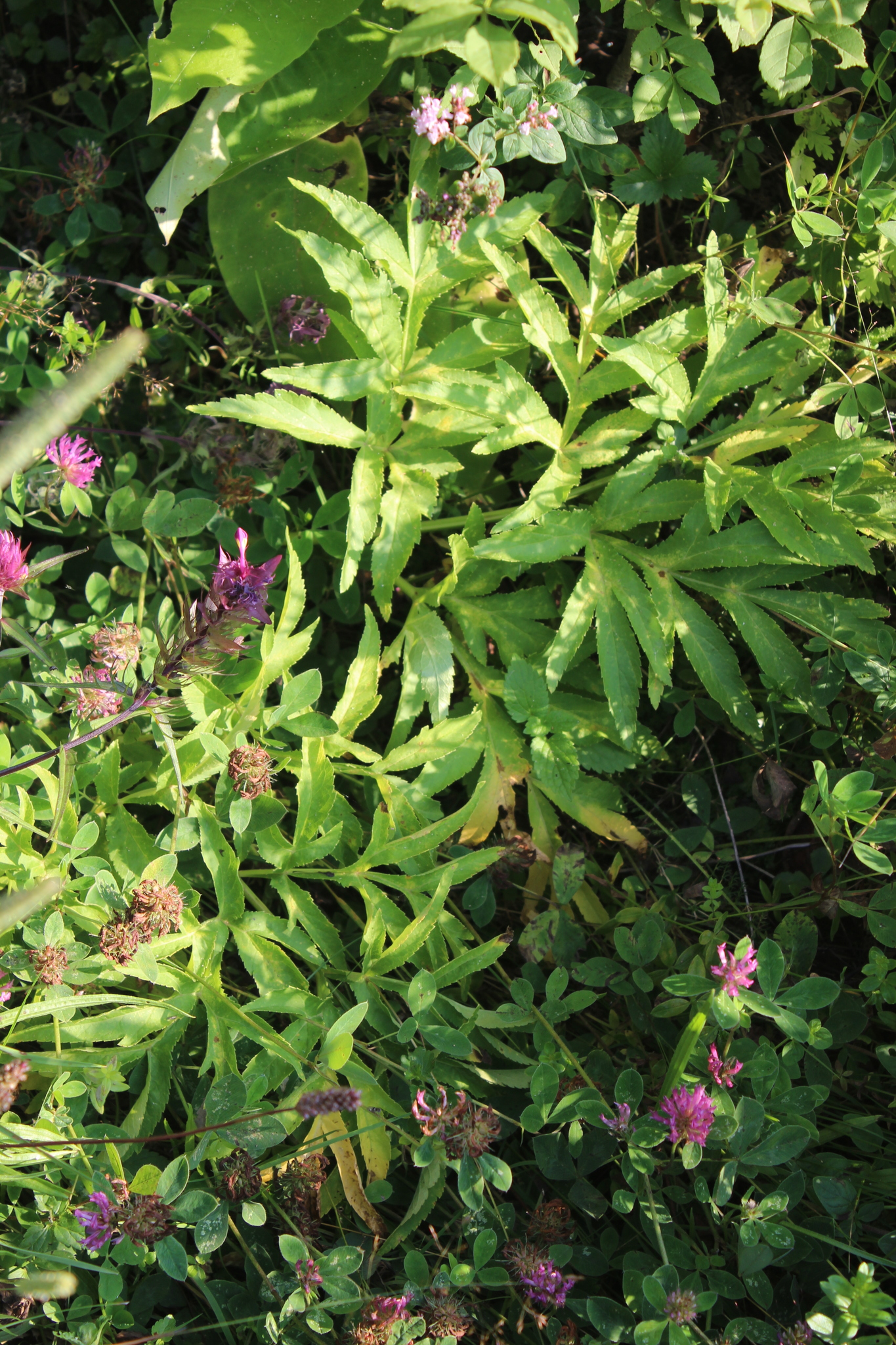
Closeup of leaf rosette growing among red clover (Trifolium sp.)
