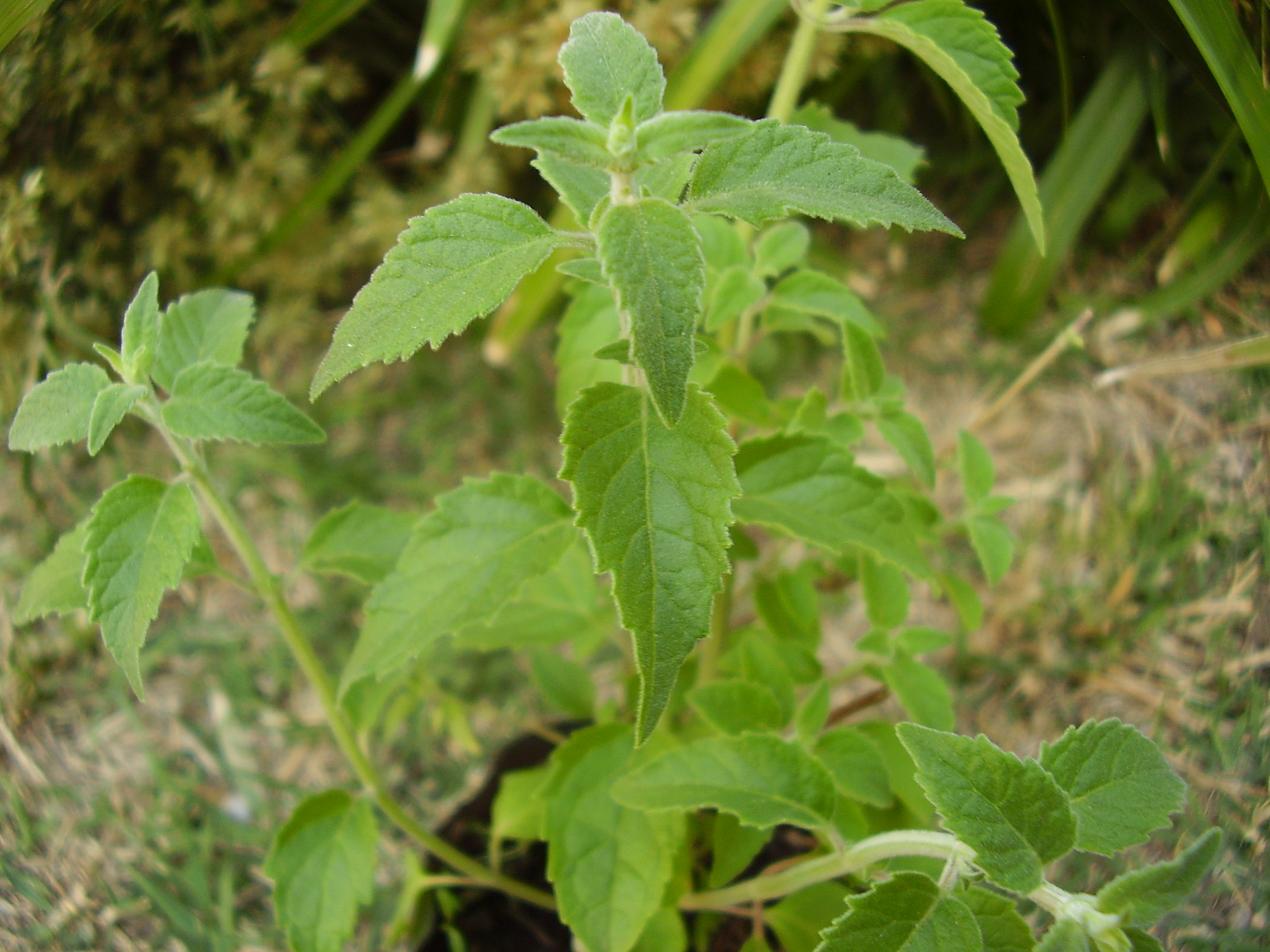

Scientific classification
- Kingdom: Plantae
- Clade: Tracheophytes
- Clade: Angiosperms
- Clade: Eudicots
- Clade: Asterids
- Order: Lamiales
- Family: Lamiaceae
- Genus: Minthostachys
- Species: M. verticillata

Binomial name
- Minthostachys verticillata (Griseb.) Epling

Synonyms
- Xenopoma verticillatum Griseb.; Bystropogon kuntzeanum Briq.; Minthostachys verticillata var. eupatorioides Epling

= Minthostachys verticillata =

Species of flowering plant

Minthostachys verticillata is a species of flowering plant in the family Lamiaceae. It is commonly known as peperina, is the only species of the genus Minthostachys known from Argentina. It occurs in the northwestern and central regions of the country. It may be the most economically important species of its genus, as it is collected extensively for its essential oils. These have been repeatedly examined for their composition, variability, and possible pharmacological effects. Due to varying views on the circumscription of species, the species is sometimes subsumed with others under the catch-all name Minthostachys mollis.
