= Dalby's Carminative =

Drug

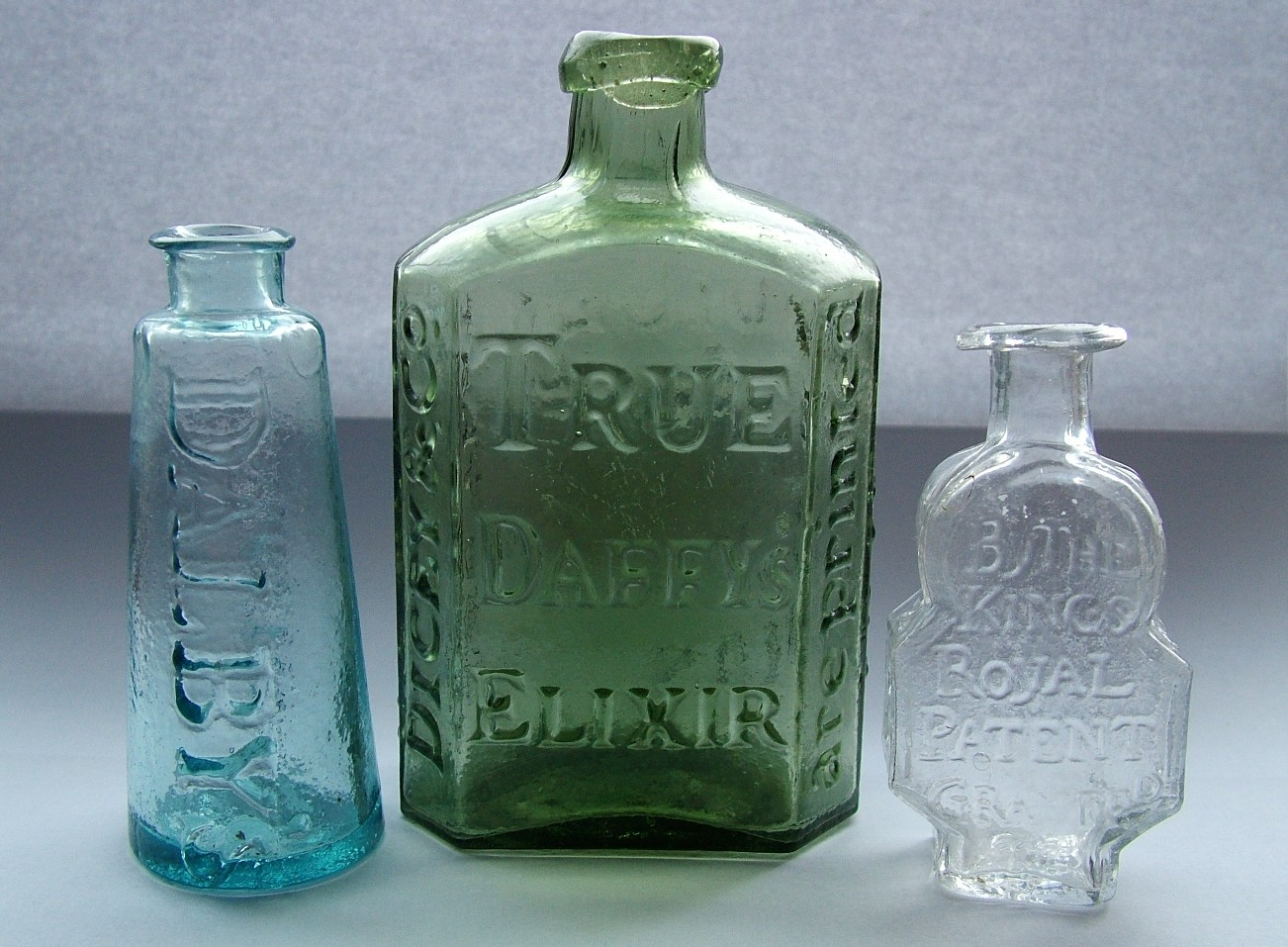
Dalby's Carminative, leftmost bottle

Dalby's Carminative was one of the two most widely used patent medicines given to babies and children at the end of the 18th and beginning of the 19th centuries. Together with its rival, Godfrey's Cordial, they were known as "mother's friends" and were used (often against a doctor's advice) for everything from colic and coughs to typhoid.

A carminative is a drug that relieves gas from the digestive tract, flatulence and colic in infants. The formula claimed to aid “infants afflicted with wind, watery gripes, fluxes and other disorders of the stomach and bowels”. The main active ingredient in both formulas was opium. There are stories of nurses who overdosed the babies in their care to keep them quiet and no bother, and babies did die from time to time. Today, the medicine is mostly known by collectors of old glass bottles.

== History ==
The formula for Dalby's Carminative was created by Joseph Dalby, surgeon and apothecary of London, England, in the 1770s. Born Joseph Dolby, Joseph changed the spelling of his name to "Dalby" when he married Anne Sparrow in 1739.

In a 1773 Act of the Parliament of Great Britain, Dalby's Carminative is listed with other "medicinal preparations" as a product liable for stamp duties, giving it official status.

Joseph Dalby died in 1784. He left the recipe for the carminative to his daughter Frances (174–-1845), who married Anthony Gell. Joseph's son James (1750–1815) kept the blue J. Dalby bottles and set up manufacturing himself, claiming to be the original creator. Frances and her husband then "rebranded" the product as Gell-Dalby, which was sold in brown bottles. Both children claimed to have the original recipe.

The Will of Joseph Dalby, proved at London 27 July 1784 is often held up as one of the most eccentric Georgian wills. He is buried in Westminster Abbey, South Cloister.

=== In the United States ===
By the 1770s, Dalby's Carminative and many other English medicines were also North American hits. Shipments of all sorts of medicines were sent from England to the colonies. The American War of Independence involved a blockade and ships carrying commodities from England were often sunk or captured. Many a bottle of medicine had to be smuggled to the new United States. It was not long before Americans found that they could wash out the distinctive Dalby's and other bottles and refill them with their own concoctions and the patent medicine business took off in America. Soon American glass companies were making knock-off bottles. Recipes were being traded around by apothecaries, and by the mid-1780s, Dalby's was actually no longer shipping overseas, although "Dalby's Carminative" was sold everywhere in the United States. Pirated versions were being manufactured and sold there until after 1900.

== Recipe ==
As listed in The Lancet, a recipe consists of:

- Tincture of opium – four drachms and a half
- Tincture of assafoetida – two drachms and a half
- Oil of carraways – three scruples
- Oil of peppermint – six scruples
- Tincture of castor – six drachms and a half
- Rectified spirits of wine – six drachms

Put two drachms into each bottle, with magnesia - one drachm, and fill up with simple syrup and a little rectified wine.

== Bibliography ==
- Dalby's Carminative and Mrs. Winslow's Soothing Syrup, both pontiled at Antique Medicine Bottles Dr Cannon's Medicine Chest
- The Dublin Journal of Medical Science. Original from Harvard University: Hodges and Smith. 1843. p. 418.
