= Monocyclic monoterpene ketone monooxygenase =

Class of enzymes

Identifiers
- EC no.: 1.14.13.105

Databases
- BRENDA: enzyme data
- ExPASy: NiceZyme view
- KEGG: enzyme entry
- MetaCyc: metabolic pathway
- Rhea: reactions
- PDB structures: RCSB PDB PDBe PDBsum
Search
- PMC: articles
- PubMed: articles
- NCBI: proteins

Monocyclic monoterpene ketone monooxygenase (EC 1.14.13.105, 1-hydroxy-2-oxolimonene 1,2-monooxygenase, dihydrocarvone 1,2-monooxygenase, MMKMO) is an enzyme with systematic name (-)-menthone, NADPH:oxygen oxidoreductase. This enzyme catalyses the several chemical reaction, for example the conversion of (–)-menthone to mentholactone:

menthone
+ NADPH + H^{+}
O_{2}
H_{2}O
mentholactone
+ NADP^{+}

This enzyme is a flavoprotein of Baeyer-Villiger monooxygenase type, which uses molecular oxygen as oxidant and incorporates one of its atoms into the starting material. It can act on a variety of monoterpene ketones and cyclohexanones.
