= Emmenagogue =

Herbs that stimulate blood flow in the pelvic area

Emmenagogues (also spelled emmenagogs) are herbs which stimulate blood flow in the pelvic area and uterus; some stimulate menstruation. Women may use emmenagogues to stimulate menstrual flow when menstruation is absent for reasons other than pregnancy, such as hormonal disorders or conditions like oligomenorrhea. These herbs were also used to assist women whose menstruation was "delayed", for the reason that they had conceived. There are a large number of substances which can act as emmenagogues. Many, such as Mentha pulegium, European pennyroyal, or tansy, may bring on menses when administered as a tea. However, if a concentrated dose is taken, such as by consuming an oil, they can pose serious medical risks including organ damage and incomplete abortions. Rue (Ruta graveolens) and wild rue (Peganum harmala) are other commonly available emmenagogues which can result in serious harm.
