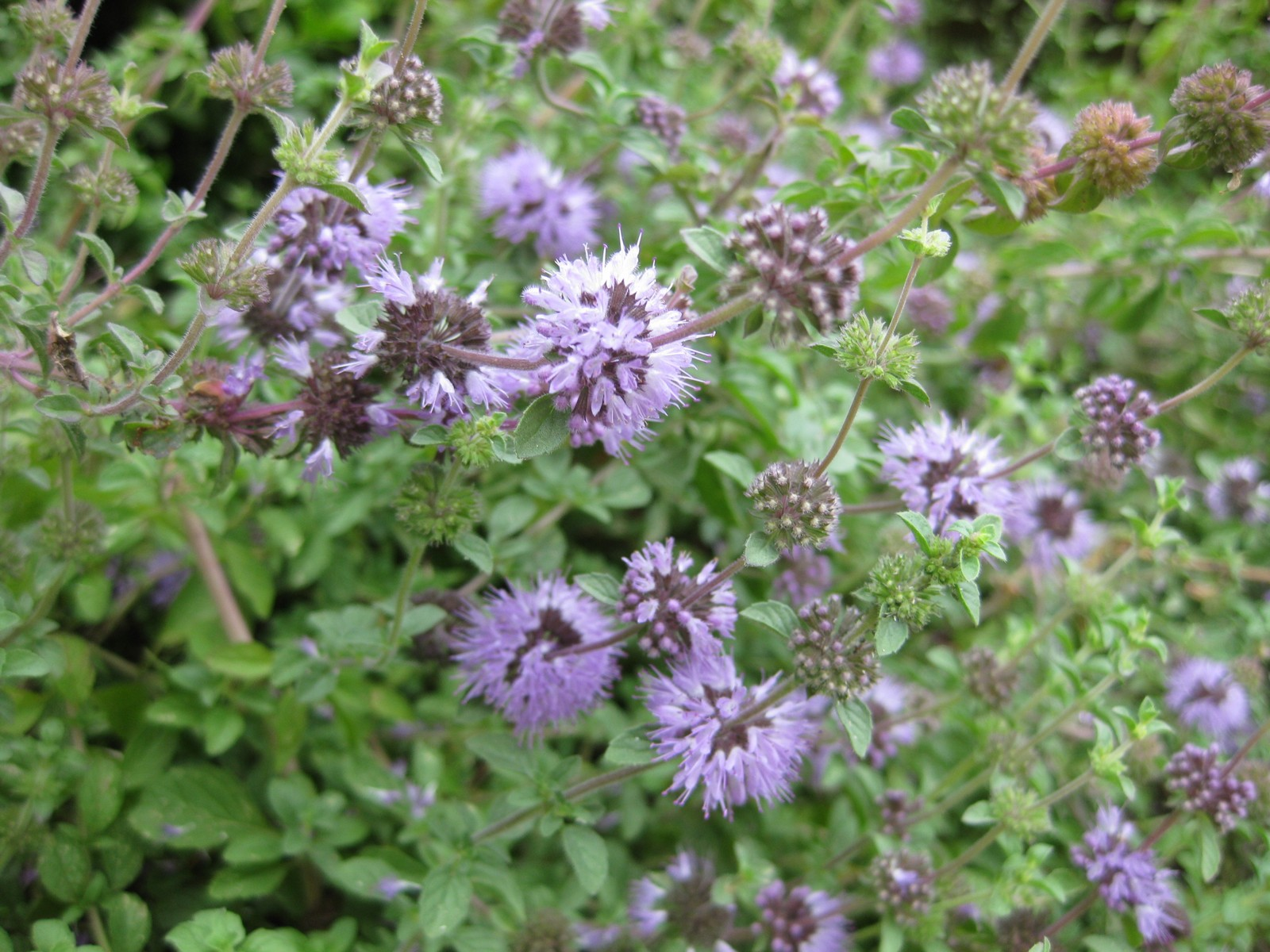

Conservation status
- Least Concern (IUCN 3.1)

Scientific classification
- Kingdom: Plantae
- Clade: Tracheophytes
- Clade: Angiosperms
- Clade: Eudicots
- Clade: Asterids
- Order: Lamiales
- Family: Lamiaceae
- Genus: Mentha
- Species: M. pulegium

Binomial name
- Mentha pulegium L.

= Mentha pulegium =

Species of plant

Mentha pulegium, commonly (European) pennyroyal, or pennyrile, also called mosquito plant and pudding grass, is a species of flowering plant in the mint family, Lamiaceae, native to Europe, North Africa, and the Middle East. Crushed pennyroyal leaves emit a very strong fragrance similar to spearmint. Pennyroyal is a traditional folk remedy, emmenagogue, abortifacient, and culinary herb, but is toxic to the liver and has caused some deaths. European pennyroyal is related to an American species, Hedeoma pulegioides. Though they differ in genera, they share similar chemical properties.

== Description ==
An annual to perennial plant with creeping or erect branched stems to about 40 cm in height. The stems are square in cross-section and can vary from hairless on some plants to densely hairy on others, with a green to sometimes red or purplish colour. The leaves, which grow in opposite pairs, are narrowly oval, 2–3 cm long x 1 cm wide, downy, sparsely toothed towards the tip, and taper into a short stalk. All parts of the plant are strongly scented when crushed but it does not have noticeable glands on its surface. The small (6 mm) flowers are densely packed in whorls at the nodes, widely separated, above pairs of leaf-like bracts. The calyx is a ribbed tube about 3 mm long, with five triangular teeth, the lower two being narrower and slightly longer than the upper three; it is hairy both on the inside and the outside. The corolla has four mauve lobes or "petals" and is hairy only on the outside. The flowers are bisexual and have four long stamens, two (or all four) of which project well beyond the corolla lobes. There is one long style which is forked to produce two stigmas, which also project from the flower. The fruits consist of a cluster of four brown, 1-seeded nutlets, each about 0.7 mm long.

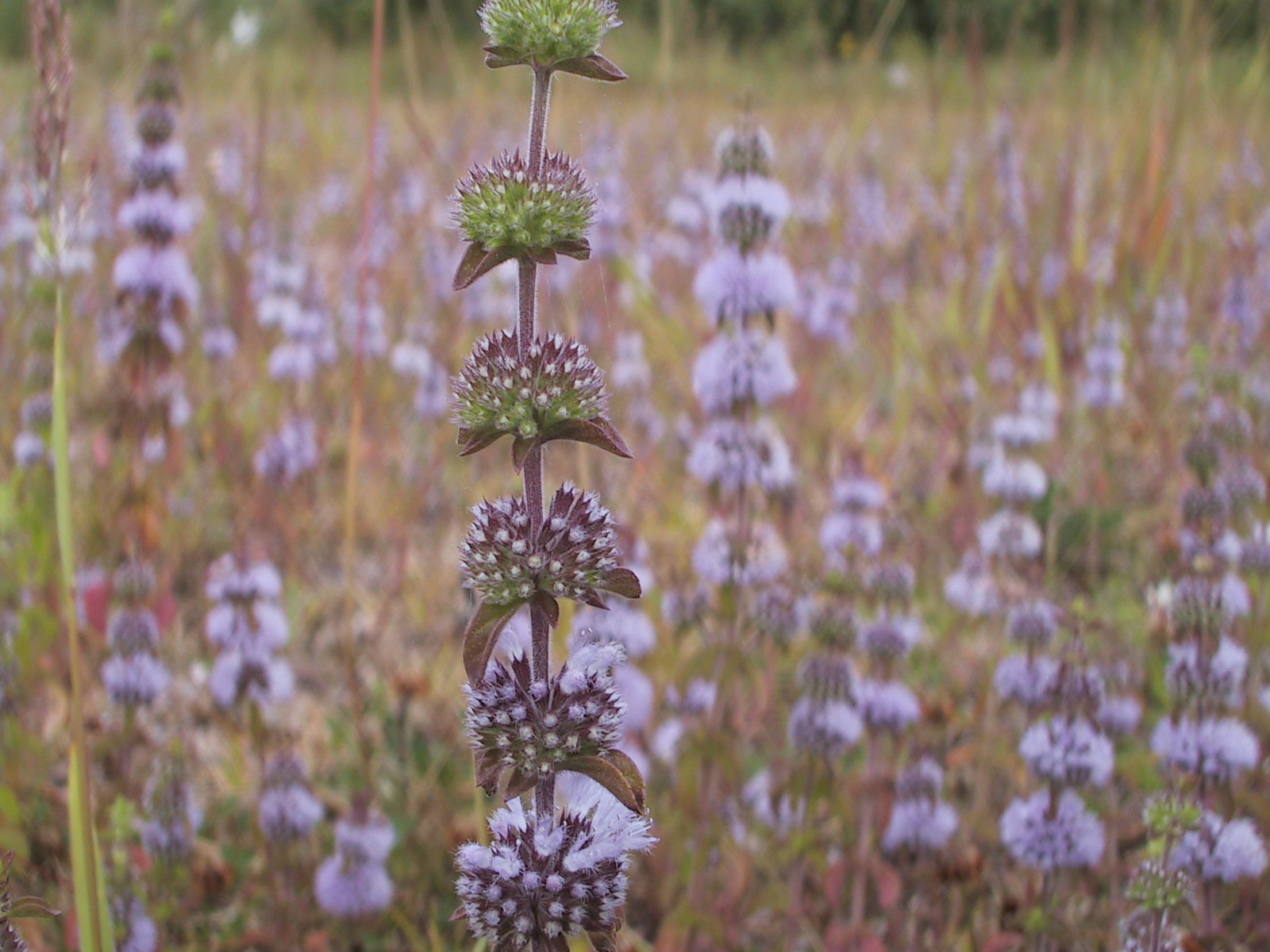
Pennyroyal can be very abundant in riverside grassland.

The flowering period starts in June and continues into mid-summer, although in northern countries it flowers rather later, sometimes as late as September, when it can fail to set seed.

Its chromosome number is 2n = 20.

== Distribution ==
The native range of pennyroyal is thought to be around the eastern Mediterranean, where it grows in damp meadows, around pools and in stream margins. It is, however, very widely established around the world, including North and South America, throughout Africa, Asia, Australia and New Zealand. In many places it is considered a troublesome weed of agriculture. Towards the northern edge of its range, as in Britain, it is considered to be rare and declining, except where introduced.

== Habitat and ecology ==
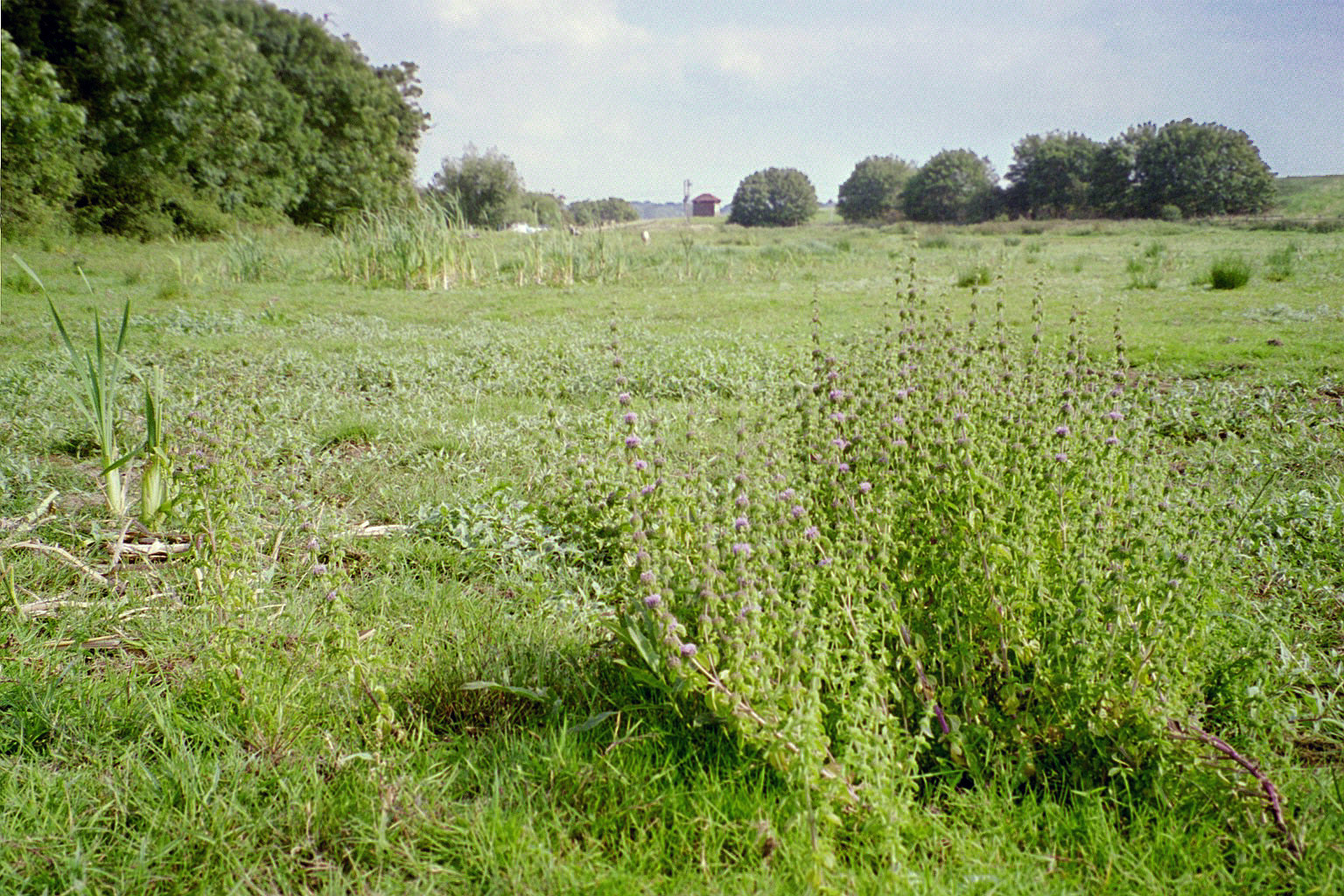
Typical habitat of pennyroyal in a seasonally inundated field by the River Nene in Northamptonshire, UK

The habitat of pennyroyal is seasonally damp pasture, where standing water over the winter leaves bare ground in the summer, and where livestock preferentially graze other plants. An analogue of this habitat is found on roadsides, where trampling or disturbance of the ground produces similarly bare soil, particularly where there is waterlogging in winter. It is also found along watercourses, in wet woodland and in abandoned fields.

In California, where it is considered an invasive species, it occupies a similar niche, in seeps, streamsides, vernal pools and swales, marshes, and ditches. There is some speculation that it may displace native species in these areas.

Few animals eat pennyroyal. In Britain, the only insect known to feed on it is the bug Heterogaster artemisiae Schilling, which is a seed bug that normally feeds on wild thyme.

It is considered an axiophyte in many British counties, because low-intensity pasture is a rare habitat, although it has been spreading in recent decades. Its Ellenberg values in Britain are L = 8, F = 7, R = 5, N = 7, and S = 0.

== History ==
=== Ancient and modern use ===
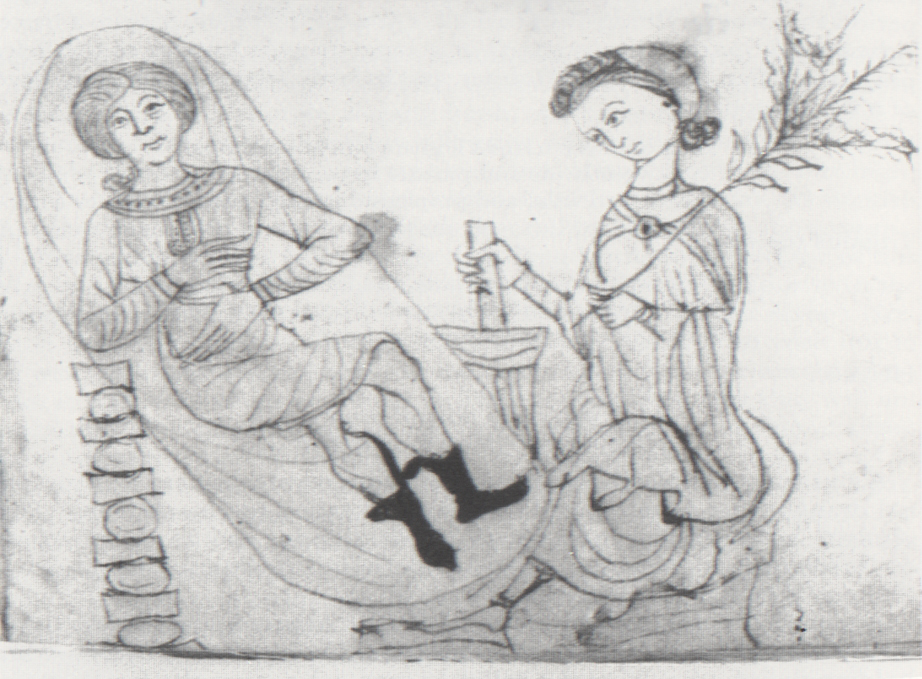
A 13th-century image of a woman preparing a pennyroyal mixture using a mortar and pestle for a pregnant woman

Documented use of pennyroyal dates back to ancient Greek, Roman, and Medieval cultures. Its name – although of uncertain etymology – is associated with Latin pulex (flea), alluding to the manner in which it was used to drive away fleas when smeared on the body. Pennyroyal was commonly incorporated as a cooking herb by the Greeks and Romans. A large number of the recipes in the Roman cookbook of Apicius called for the use of pennyroyal, often along with such herbs as lovage, oregano and coriander. Although it was commonly used for cooking also in the Middle Ages, it gradually fell out of use as a culinary herb and is seldom used as such today.

Records from Greek and Roman physicians and scholars contain information pertaining to pennyroyal's medicinal properties, as well as recipes used to prepare it. Pliny the Elder, in his encyclopedia Naturalis Historia (Natural History), described the plant as an emmenagogue, and that it also expelled a dead fetus. Galen only listed pennyroyal as an emmenagogue, as did Oribasius. Roman and Greek writers Quintus Serenus Sammonicus and Aspasia the Physician however both agreed that pennyroyal, when served in tepid water, was an effective abortive method. A medical text on gynecology attributed to Cleopatra (though it was actually written by a female Greek physician Metrodora) recommends the use of pennyroyal with wine to induce abortions.

In regard to its contraceptive properties, it was referred to in a joking manner in Aristophanes' play Peace (421 BCE). The god Hermes provides the male character Trygaios a female companion; when Trygaios asks if there would be a problem if she became pregnant, Hermes responds, "Not if you add a dose of pennyroyal." In a similar manner, in Aristophanes' comedy Lysistrata, after a pregnant female character on stage is told to withhold her body sexually from her husband, a slender female character, in comparison to the pregnant woman, is described as "a very lovely land Well croppy, and trimmed and spruced with pennyroyal."

Early settlers in colonial Virginia used dried pennyroyal to eradicate pests. Pennyroyal was such a popular herb that the Royal Society published an article on its use against rattlesnakes in the first volume of its Philosophical Transactions in 1665. 17th-century apothecary and physician Nicholas Culpeper mentions pennyroyal in his medical text The English Physitian, published in 1652. In addition to its abortive properties, Culpeper recommends its use for gastrointestinal ailments, such as constipation and hemorrhoids, as well as itching and blemishes to the skin, and even toothaches.

Pennyroyal is an essential ingredient in the North African dish, which is still eaten to this day, called Batata fliou.

Pennyroyal continues to be used up through the 20th and 21st centuries. Its oil is still commercially available today, though little is known about the appropriate dosages for humans. Scientists therefore likely consider it unsafe for use, as it is potentially toxic.

== Uses ==
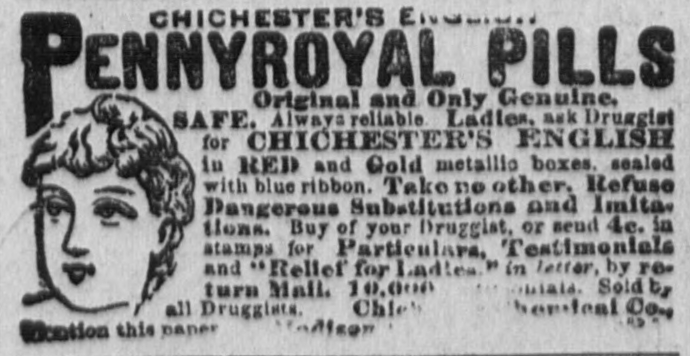
A 1905 advertisement for pennyroyal pills

Pennyroyal is frequently used as an insecticide and pest repellent. As a pest repellent, it is used to keep fleas away from household animals as well as on humans to ward off gnats and mosquitos. Some flea collars for pets have pennyroyal oil or the herb can be crushed in the lining. Humans have also put crushed pennyroyal stems in their pockets or on their clothing to ward off unwanted insects. However, when using the pennyroyal plant as a pest repellent, the use of the concentrated pennyroyal oil should be avoided. Pennyroyal oil can be extremely toxic to both humans and animals, even in small quantities. With the use of pennyroyal around animals and humans comes the risk of it being absorbed through the skin and causing negative health effects. The less concentrated leaves of the plant should be used instead as an insect repellent.

Pennyroyal has historically also been used as a mint flavoring in herbal teas and foods. It is recommended that pennyroyal tea should not be drunk on a regular basis. Consumption of pennyroyal tea can be fatal to infants and children.

In Italy the fresh leaves of this plant, which in Rome and the surrounding area is called menta romana, are used in the capital's cuisine to flavour lamb and tripe. In culinary use it should not be confused with lesser calamint (Clinopodium nepeta), which in Rome is used to prepare artichokes.

The pennyroyal plant has also been used as an emmenagogue and an abortifacient. Rennie's 1833 supplement to the pharmacopeias admitted its use as an "expectorant, diuretic, and emmenagogue" in doses of 10 grains to 1 scruple (0.6–1.3g) of the powdered dried herb, but dismissed the use of the Pennyroyal Water (Aqua Pulegii) as "popularly but erroneously supposed" to be an abortifacient [no mention is made of toxicity]. Chemicals in the pennyroyal plant cause the uterine lining to contract, causing a woman's uterine lining to shed. Since the U.S. Congress passed the Dietary Supplement Health and Education Act in October 1994, all manufactured forms of pennyroyal in the United States have carried a warning label against its use by pregnant women, but pennyroyal is not regulated by the U.S. Food and Drug Administration.

At least one study has shown pennyroyal oil to have potent acaricidal activity against house dust mites.

== Toxicity ==
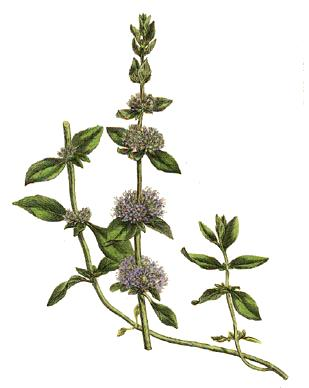
Pennyroyal

Pennyroyal is toxic to humans and has differing effects dependent on the volume and concentration ingested. The most concentrated and toxic form of the pennyroyal plant is pennyroyal oil. The oil contains pulegone (a cyclohexanone), the molecule found in the highest concentration (80-92%) in the pennyroyal plant. Pulegone causes a variety of ailments in those who ingest it and is what causes the plant to have its peppermint flavor.

Symptoms that may persist after ingesting a small dose (<10 mL) of pennyroyal oil are nausea, vomiting, abdominal pain and dizziness. Larger volumes may result in multiorgan failure that could lead to death. There are no current toxicokinetics studies performed on humans for the effects of pulegone, but there are some studies performed on other mammals. When pulegone is ingested, it is broken down by the liver and reacts to form multiple toxic metabolites that can wreak havoc in the body. Some identified metabolites are menthofuran, piperitenone, piperitone, and menthone.

As little as 10 mL of pennyroyal oil ingestion was associated with moderate to severe hepatic toxicity.

== Chemistry ==
=== Structure and reactivity ===
Pulegone

The active chemical in pennyroyal is pulegone. Pulegone is a ketone and on the cellular level, ketones can act as enzyme inhibitors. The carbonyl center of the pulegone structure acts as a strong electrophile, causing active sites on enzymes to bind with pulegone instead of the target protein.

The exocyclic double bond found in pulegone is vital to the activation and binding mechanism of the molecule and causes it to be an effective hepatotoxin. When ingested, pulegone targets the liver and kidneys, among other organs. Studies conducted on rats show that one of the main effects is the inhibition of contractile activity in the myometrium and death by kidney failure. The studies also found that long-term exposure to pennyroyal increased incidences of urinary bladder tumors.

=== Mechanism of action ===
Menthofuran

The exact mechanism of action by which pennyroyal induces menses and abortions in humans is still unknown. Studies using animal models speculate the source of liver toxicity is due to one of the many constituents the plant contains: pulegone, a monoterpene. Pulegone is metabolized by cytochrome P450 (CYP 1A2 and 2E1) and converted to several toxins. Both in vitro and in vivo studies have found the pulegone metabolite menthofuran to be an inhibitor of CYP2A6, accounting for a significant degree of pennyroyal's hepatotoxicity.

The exact pathway by which pulegone is converted to menthofuran is unknown, but one study strongly suggested it included allylic oxidation of a methyl group (from CYP450), intramolecular cyclization to form a hemiketal, and subsequent dehydration to form the furan. Pthofuran may deplete glutathione levels, leaving hepatocytes vulnerable to free radical damage.

== Treatment ==
There is no known antidote for pennyroyal toxicity. Case studies involving pennyroyal poisonings have reported the use of gastric lavages and administration of emetics or vomiting inducing agents, or absorbents like activated charcoal. As glutathione depletion has been shown to regulate liver toxification, administration of N-acetylcysteine in similar doses as given for acetaminophen toxicity have been given to patients.

A study testing pulegone toxicity found inhibitors of cytochrome P450, such as cobaltous chloride or piperonyl butoxide, blocked toxicity. Such testing has not been expanded to humans, however, as the pennyroyal mechanism of toxicity is still not entirely understood.

== See also ==
- Pennyroyal Tea (1993 song by American rock band Nirvana)
