= Peppermint pig =

Confection and Christmas tradition popular in the northeastern United States

A peppermint pig is a hard candy made with sugar and peppermint, which are poured into a pig-shaped mold. The candy originated in the town of Saratoga Springs, New York, but is popular across the United States.

The production of the candy, as well as the traditions associated with it, were born in Saratoga Springs during the nineteenth century. Production is often cited as beginning in the 1880s and slowing to a halt during World War II. In 1988, a local confectioner in Saratoga Springs began producing the candy once more, and continues to do so to this day. An 8 ounce peppermint pig is sold in a velvet bag along with a metal hammer, and tradition dictates that the pig is to be smashed inside of the bag using the hammer at Christmas dinner. Each person at the table takes a turn with the hammer and eats a piece of the candy, which is said to bring good fortune for the upcoming year.

== See also ==
- Hard candy
- Candy cane
