= Peppermint extract =

Herbal extract of peppermint

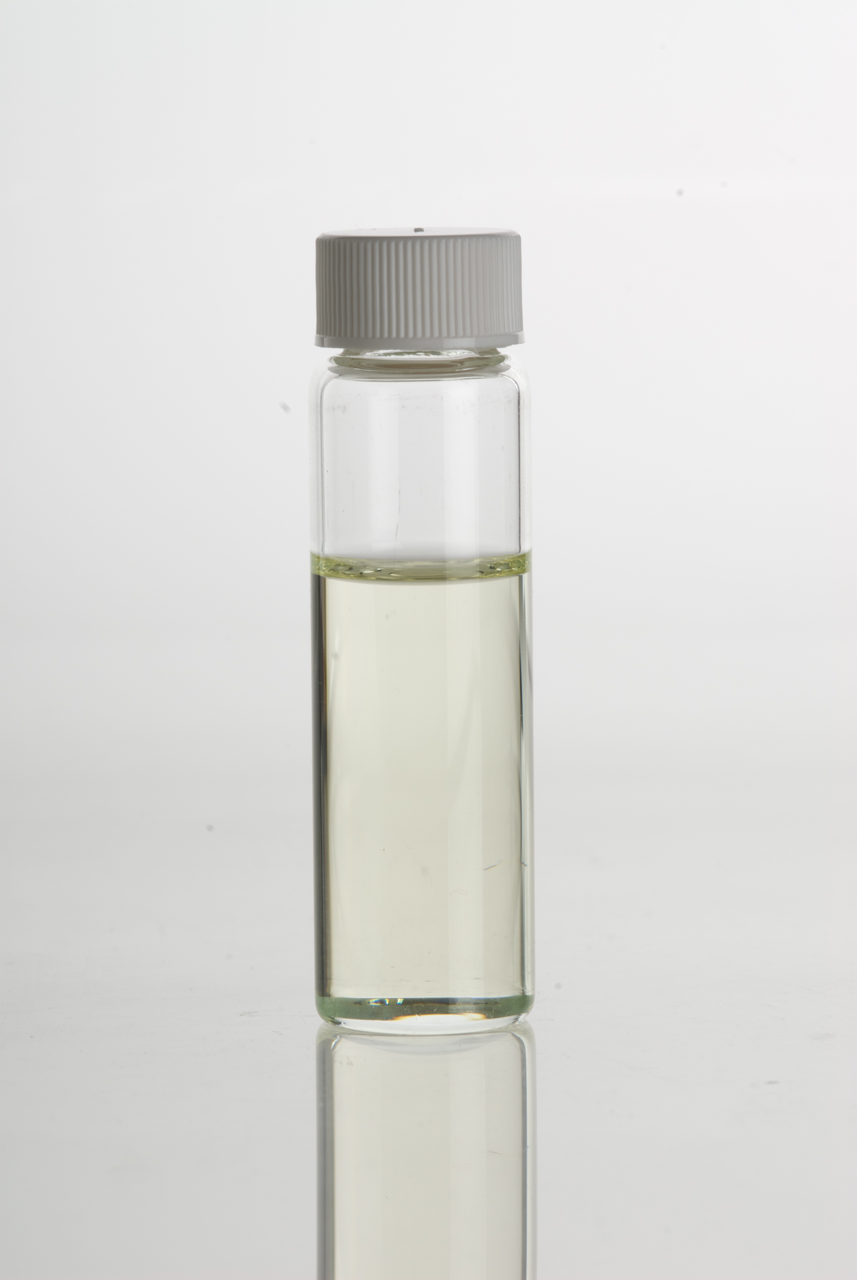
A vial of peppermint essential oils extract

Peppermint extract is an extract of peppermint (Mentha × piperita) made from the essential oil of peppermint leaves. Peppermint is a hybrid of water mint and spearmint. The oil has been used for various purposes over centuries.

Peppermint extract is commonly used in cooking, as a dietary supplement, as an herbal or alternative medicine, as a pest repellent, and a flavor or fragrance agent for cleaning products, cosmetics, mouthwash, chewing gum, and candies. Its active ingredient menthol causes a cold sensation when peppermint extract is consumed or used topically.

There is insufficient evidence to conclude peppermint oil is effective for treating any medical condition, and ingesting it may cause adverse effects, including a possible allergic reaction.

== Extraction ==
Peppermint extract is obtained through steam distillation, solvent extraction, and soxhlet extraction.

== Uses ==
Peppermint extract is commonly used as a flavoring agent; it is also used in alternative medical treatments, although there is no sufficient evidence that peppermint extract is effective for treating any medical condition.

A 2022 systematic review concluded that peppermint oil appears to be more effective than placebo in relieving irritable bowel syndrome symptoms and abdominal pain, but that it carries a higher risk of adverse events, including a possible allergic response; most reported side effects were acid reflux and indigestion. Although peppermint oil was superior to placebo for irritable bowel syndrome, the quality of evidence assessed in the 2022 review was very low and adverse events occurred more frequently.

Peppermint oil, especially when inhaled or used in massage, may be effective in reducing nausea and vomiting (but not vomiting alone) in cancer patients undergoing treatment.

Moderate levels can be safely mixed into food items, or applied topically, sprayed on surfaces as a household cleaner, or inhaled using aromatherapy. However, the menthol in peppermint oil may cause serious side effects in children and infants if inhaled.

Peppermint oil may have adverse interactions with prescription drugs.

=== Uses in cooking ===
Peppermint extract can be used to add a peppermint flavor to baked goods, desserts, and candy, particularly candy canes, mints, and peppermint patties.

Peppermint extract can be substituted in recipes with peppermint oil, crème de menthe, or peppermint schnapps.

=== Use as a pest repellent ===
Peppermint oil is commonly used to repel ants, flying insects, rodents, and spiders.
