= (+)-Pulegone reductase =

Class of enzymes

(+)-pulegone reductase

Identifiers
- EC no.: 1.3.1.81

Databases
- IntEnz: IntEnz view
- BRENDA: BRENDA entry
- ExPASy: NiceZyme view
- KEGG: KEGG entry
- MetaCyc: metabolic pathway
- PRIAM: profile
- PDB structures: RCSB PDB PDBe PDBsum
Search
- PMC: articles
- PubMed: articles
- NCBI: proteins

(+)-pulegone reductase (EC 1.3.1.81) is an enzyme with systematic name (−)-menthone:NADP^{+} oxidoreductase. This enzyme catalises the following chemical reaction

(+)-pulegone
+ NADPH
H^{+}
H^{+}
70% (–)-menthone
+
30% (+)-isomenthone
+ NADP^{+}

This enzyme, from peppermint converts (+)-pulegone to a mixture of (–)-menthone and (+)-isomenthone using nicotinamide adenine dinucleotide phosphate (NADPH) as its cofactor. It does not act in the opposite direction
