= Pulegone =

Names
- Preferred IUPAC name (5R)-5-Methyl-2-(propan-2-ylidene)cyclohexan-1-one
- Other names p-Menth-4(8)-en-3-one; δ-4(8)-p-Menthen-3-one; (R)-2-Isopropylidene-5-methylcyclohexanone; (R)-p-Menth-4(8)-en-3-one; (R)-(+)-Pulegone

Identifiers
CAS Number	89-82-7
3D model (JSmol)	Interactive image
ChEBI	CHEBI:35596
ChemSpider	390923
ECHA InfoCard	100.001.767
PubChem CID	442495
UNII	4LF2673R3G
CompTox Dashboard (EPA)	DTXSID2025975
- InChI: InChI=1S/C10H16O/c1-7(2)9-5-4-8(3)6-10(9)11/h8H,4-6H2,1-3H3/t8-/m1/s1 Key: NZGWDASTMWDZIW-MRVPVSSYSA-N; InChI=1/C10H16O/c1-7(2)9-5-4-8(3)6-10(9)11/h8H,4-6H2,1-3H3/t8-/m1/s1 Key: NZGWDASTMWDZIW-MRVPVSSYBS
- SMILES: O=C1/C(=C(/C)C)CC[C@@H](C)C1

Properties
Chemical formula	C_{10}H_{16}O
Molar mass	152.237 g·mol^{−1}
Appearance	Colorless oil
Density	0.9346 g/cm^{3}
Boiling point	224 °C (435 °F; 497 K)
Solubility in water	Insoluble
Solubility in organic solvent	Miscible

Hazards
Safety data sheet (SDS)	MSDS
- Except where otherwise noted, data are given for materials in their standard state (at 25 °C [77 °F], 100 kPa). Infobox references

Pulegone is a naturally occurring organic compound obtained from the essential oils of a variety of plants such as Nepeta cataria (catnip), Mentha piperita, and pennyroyal. It is classified as a monoterpenoid, which means that it is an oxidized derivative of a terpene, a large class of naturally occurring C_{10} hydrocarbons.

Pulegone is a colorless oil with a pleasant odor similar to pennyroyal, peppermint, and camphor. It is used in flavoring agents, in perfumery, and in aromatherapy.

== Isolation and some uses ==
Pulegone comprises 75% of the oil pressed from pennyroyal, which is cultivated for that purpose. Hydrogenation of pulegone gives menthone. Pulegone is also a precursor to menthofuran, another flavorant.

== Biochemistry ==
The enzyme (+)-pulegone reductase from peppermint catalyses a reduction reaction which gives a mixture of (–)-menthone and (+)-isomenthone:

(+)-pulegone
+ NADPH
H^{+}
H^{+}
70% (–)-menthone
+
30% (+)-isomenthone
+ NADP^{+}

It uses nicotinamide adenine dinucleotide phosphate (NADPH) as its cofactor.

== Toxicology ==
It was reported that the chemical is toxic to rats if a large quantity is consumed.

Pulegone is also an insecticide − the most powerful of three insecticides naturally occurring in many mint species.

As of October 2018, the FDA withdrew authorization for the use of pulegone as a synthetic flavoring substance for use in food, but that naturally occurring pulegone can continue to be used.

== Sources ==
- Creeping charlie
- Mentha longifolia
- Mentha suaveolens
- Pennyroyal
- Peppermint
- Schizonepeta tenuifolia
- Bursera graveolens

== See also ==
- Menthofuran
- Menthol
