= Pkhali =

Georgian dish of chopped and minced vegetables

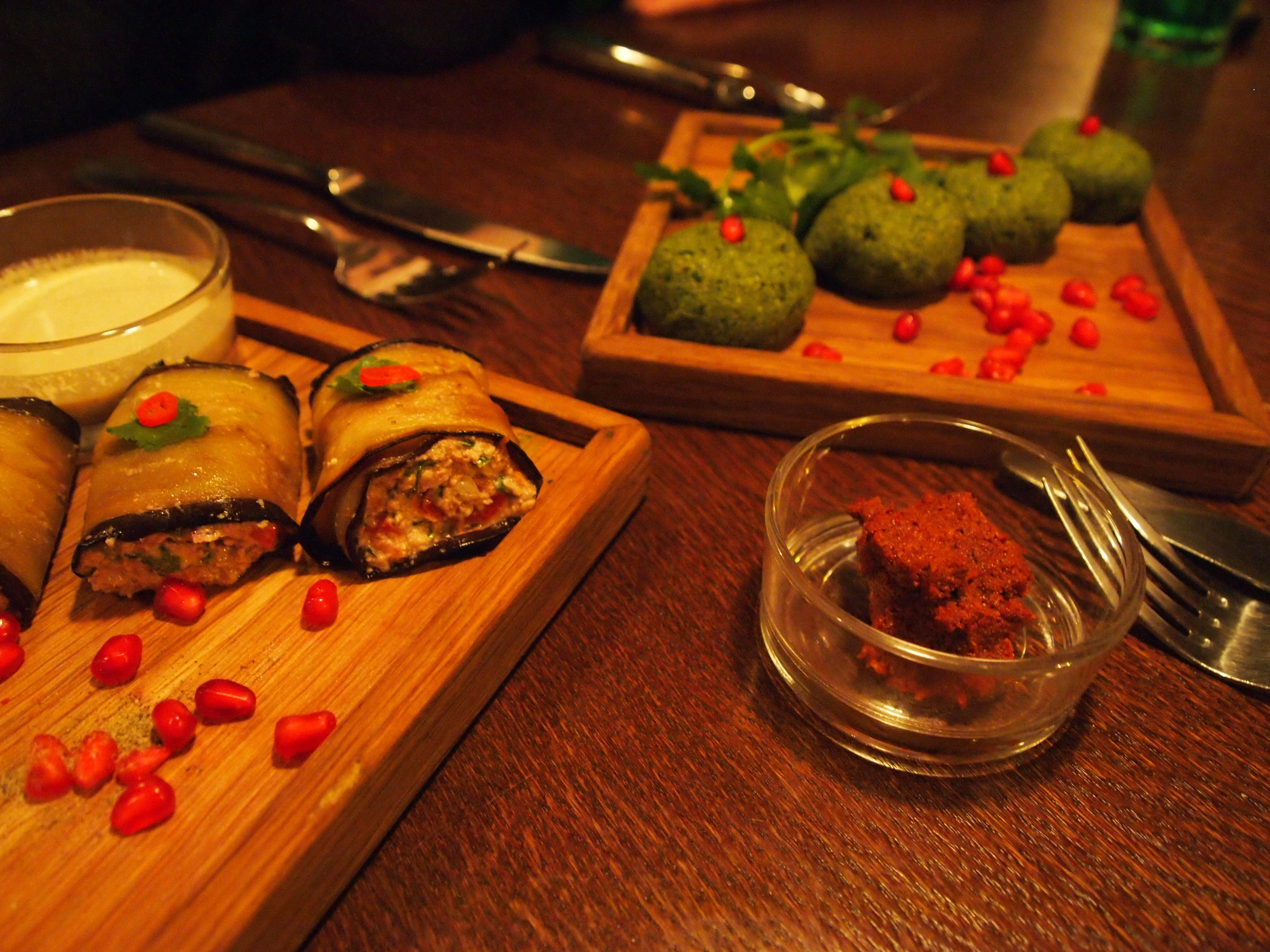
- Spinach pkhali (upper-right corner) with badrijani & ajika
- Place of origin: Georgia

Pkhali (Georgian: ფხალი) is a traditional Georgian dish of chopped and minced vegetables, made of cabbage, eggplant, spinach, beans, beets and combined with ground walnuts, vinegar, onions, garlic, and herbs. Pkhali is also called mkhali. The common ingredient of all variations of pkhali is puréed walnut sauce. In Georgian restaurants, pkhali is usually served in three types: spinach, beetroot and white beans.

== Chicken pkhali ==
Katmis mkhali is a variation on the traditional pkhali. Boiled chicken is shredded and combined with seasoned nuts along with chicken broth in order to bind. Chopped herbs are then added and the salad is chilled for 3-5 hours. The texture of the salad is similar to paste. Pkhali is generally served with lettuce and pomegranate seeds.

== Gallery ==
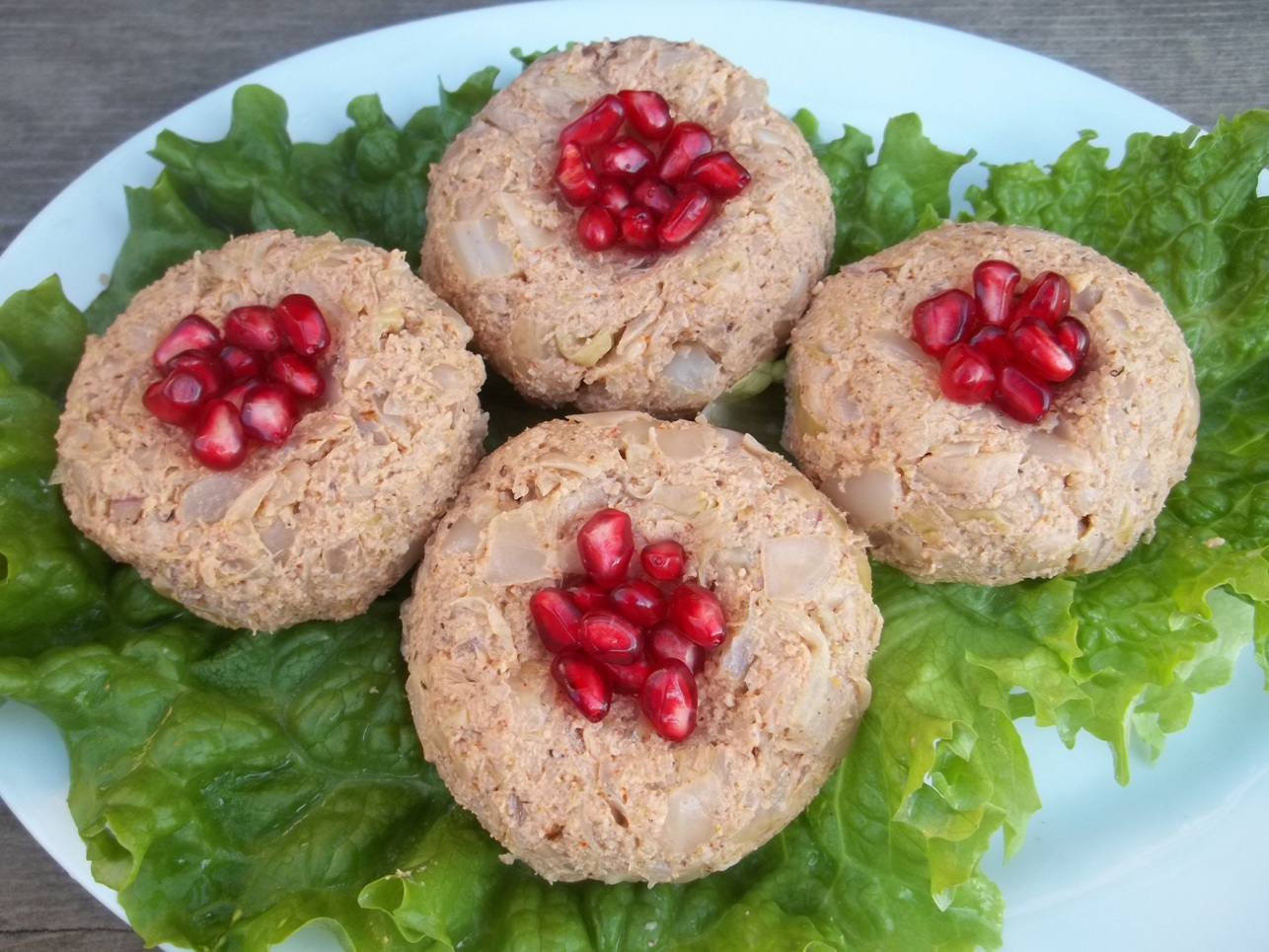
Cabbage pkhali

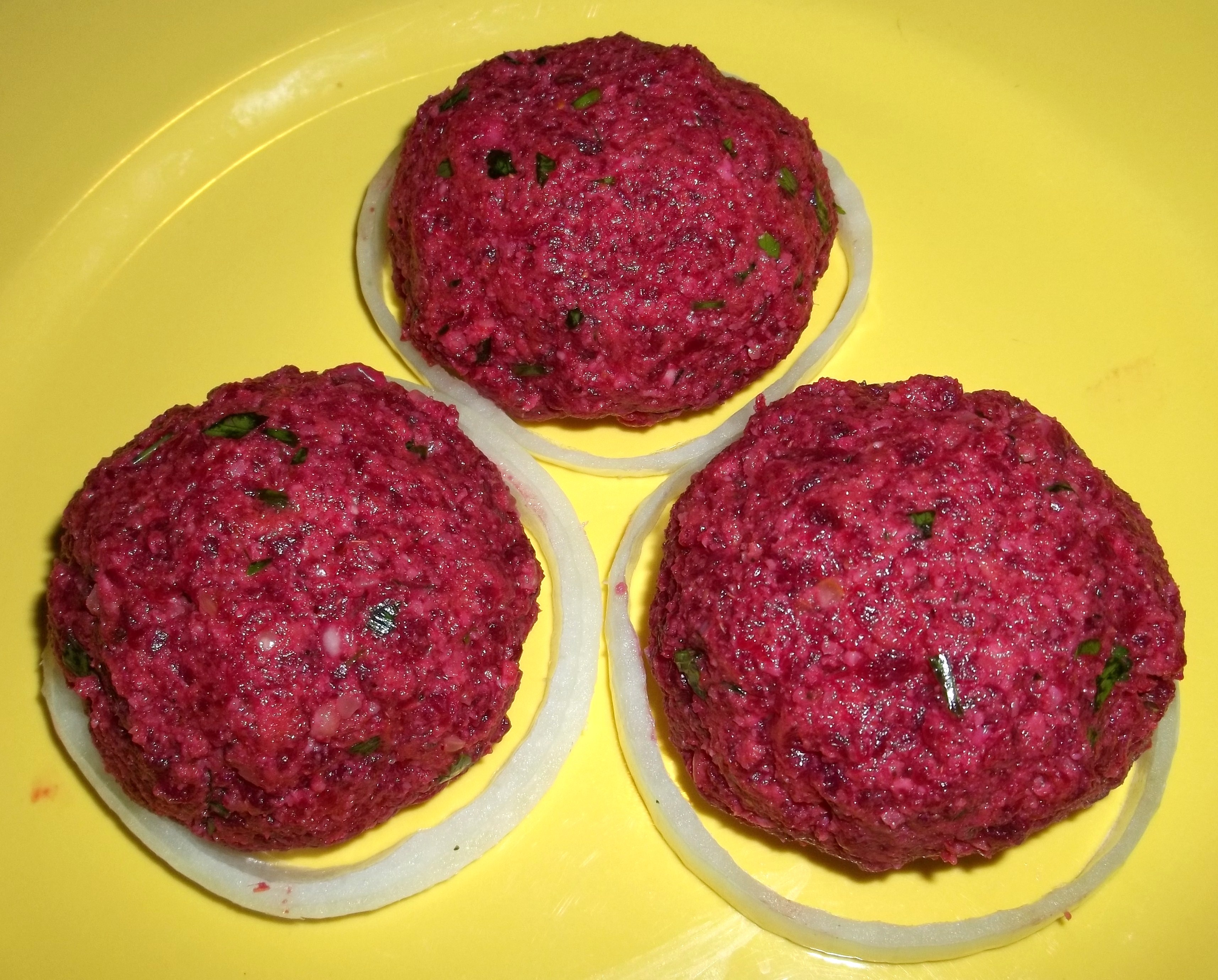
Beetroot pkhali
