= Menthofuran =

Names
- IUPAC name 3,6-Dimethyl-4,5,6,7-tetrahydro-1-benzofuran

Identifiers
CAS Number	494-90-6; 17957-94-7 (R); 80183-38-6 (S)
3D model (JSmol)	Interactive image
ChEBI	CHEBI:50542
ChemSpider	292309
ECHA InfoCard	100.007.087
PubChem CID	329983
UNII	LK024V9U3C; 9N0IS8189W (R); OS9602CGD2 (S)
CompTox Dashboard (EPA)	DTXSID9025534
- InChI: InChI=1S/C10H14O/c1-7-3-4-9-8(2)6-11-10(9)5-7/h6-7H,3-5H2,1-2H3 Key: YGWKXXYGDYYFJU-UHFFFAOYSA-N; InChI=1/C10H14O/c1-7-3-4-9-8(2)6-11-10(9)5-7/h6-7H,3-5H2,1-2H3 Key: YGWKXXYGDYYFJU-UHFFFAOYAW
- SMILES: o1c2c(c(c1)C)CCC(C2)C

Properties
Chemical formula	C_{10}H_{14}O
Molar mass	150.221 g·mol^{−1}
Boiling point	208

Hazards
Flash point	86
- Except where otherwise noted, data are given for materials in their standard state (at 25 °C [77 °F], 100 kPa). Infobox references

Menthofuran is an organic compound found in a variety of essential oils including that of pennyroyal (Mentha pulegium). It is highly toxic and believed to be the primary toxin in pennyroyal responsible for its potentially fatal effects. After ingestion of menthofuran, it is metabolically activated to chemically reactive intermediates that are hepatotoxic.

== Biosynthesis ==
(+)-Menthofuran is produced in plants such as peppermint from pulegone by the enzyme menthofuran synthase.

pulegone
O_{2}
2 H_{2}O
(+)-menthofuran

== Chemistry ==
=== Synthesis ===
Menthofuran can be synthesized from 5-methylcyclohexane-1,3-dione and allenyldimethylsulfonium bromide in two steps via a furannulation strategy consisting of enolate addition and rearrangement.

== Pharmacology ==
Menthofuran is a metabolite of pulegone. Both in vitro and in vivo studies have found the pulegone metabolite menthofuran to be an inhibitor of CYP2A6.

Menthofuran may deplete glutathione levels, leaving hepatocytes vulnerable to free radical damage.
