= Piperitone =

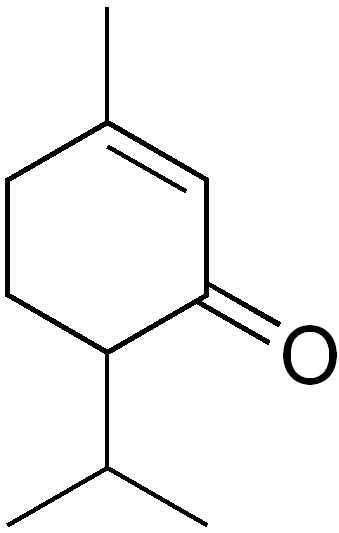

Names
- IUPAC name 6-Isopropyl-3-methyl-1-cyclohex-2-enone
- Other names 3-Carvomenthenone; p-Menth-1-en-3-one

Identifiers
CAS Number	89-81-6 (D/L); 6091-50-5 (D); 4573-50-6 (L)
3D model (JSmol)	Interactive image
ChEBI	CHEBI:48933
ChemSpider	6721
ECHA InfoCard	100.001.766
PubChem CID	6987
UNII	1VZ8RG269R; 8ZZ2GU5WBU (D); 8GZY0Q0N20 (L)
CompTox Dashboard (EPA)	DTXSID7052604
- InChI: InChI=1S/C10H16O/c1-7(2)9-5-4-8(3)6-10(9)11/h6-7,9H,4-5H2,1-3H3 Key: YSTPAHQEHQSRJD-UHFFFAOYSA-N; InChI=1/C10H16O/c1-7(2)9-5-4-8(3)6-10(9)11/h6-7,9H,4-5H2,1-3H3 Key: YSTPAHQEHQSRJD-UHFFFAOYAC
- SMILES: CC1=CC(=O)C(CC1)C(C)C

Properties
Chemical formula	C_{10}H_{16}O
Molar mass	152.23 g/mol
Density	0.9331 g/cm^{3}
Melting point	232 to 233 °C (450 to 451 °F; 505 to 506 K)
- Except where otherwise noted, data are given for materials in their standard state (at 25 °C [77 °F], 100 kPa). verify (what is ?) Infobox references

Piperitone is a natural monoterpene ketone which is a component of some essential oils. Both stereoisomers, the D-form and the L-form, are known. The D-form has a peppermint-like aroma and has been isolated from the oils of plants from the genera Cymbopogon, Andropogon, and Mentha. The L-form has been isolated from Sitka spruce.

== Occurrence ==
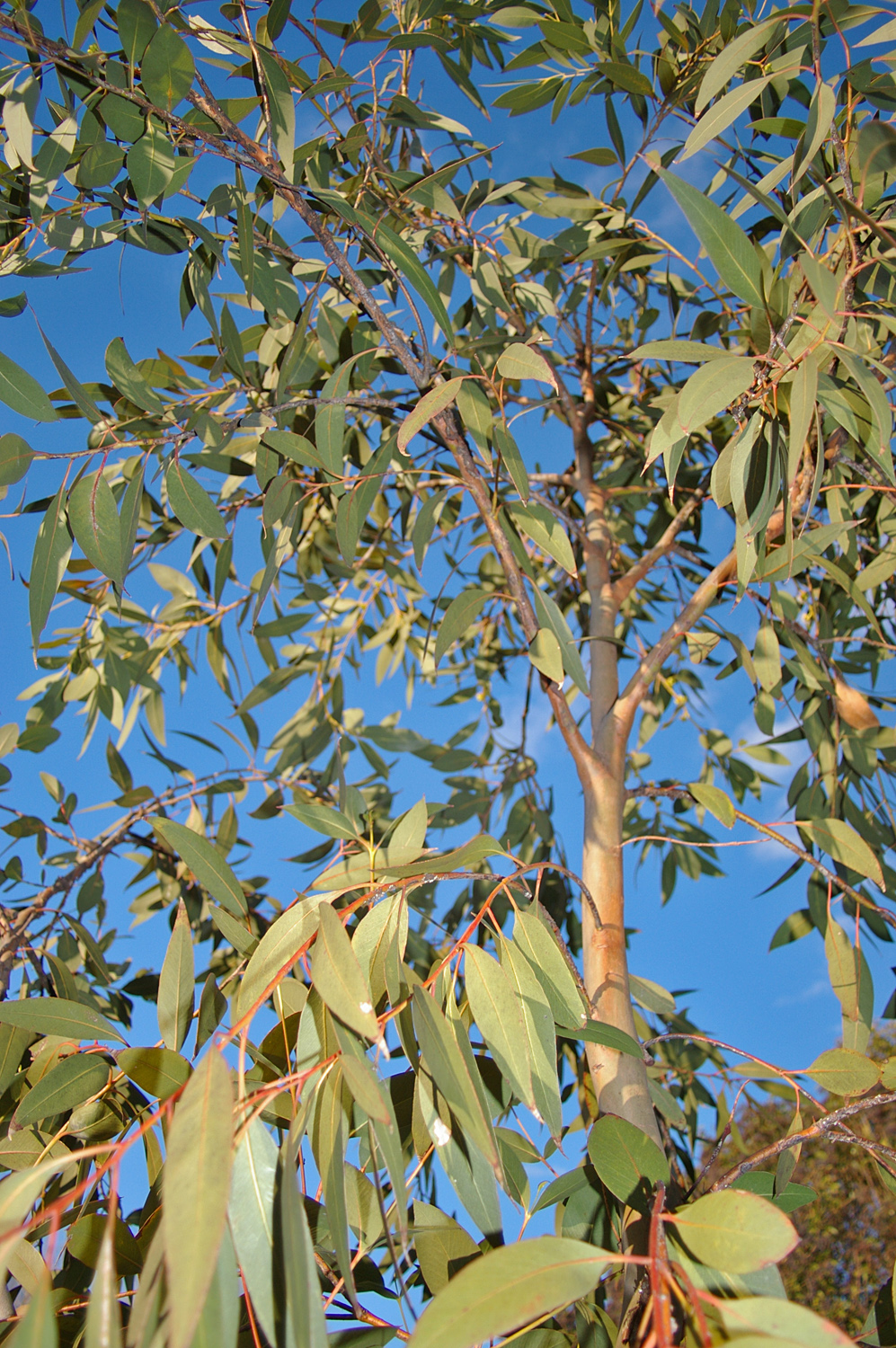
Eucalyptus dives

Piperitone is found in many essential oils, including over thirty species of the genus Eucalyptus. High levels are present in certain species of Eucalyptus and Mentha. In the genus Eucalyptus, the highest concentrations are found in Eucalyptus dives. Both enantiomers occur naturally. In Eucalyptus species, (-)-piperitone is present; in mint species, (+)-piperitone is found; and some plants contain racemate piperitone.

== Properties ==
Racemic piperitone is a colorless liquid with a distinct peppermint odour ("herbal, minty, camphoreous, medicinal").

== Production ==
Piperitone can be synthesized from isopropyl acetoacetate and 3-buten-2-one.

The primary source of D/L-piperitone is from Eucalyptus dives, produced mainly in South Africa.

== Reactions ==
Piperitone is used as the principal raw material for the production of synthetic menthol and thymol. The reduction to menthol is achieved using hydrogen and a nickel catalyst. Oxidation to thymol is accomplished with iron(III) chloride and acetic acid. It also forms adducts with benzaldehyde and hydroxylamine (an oxime), which were historically useful for compound identification by the melting points of the derivatives. Under light exposure, piperitone undergoes photodimerization, forming a polycyclic compound with a cyclobutane ring.
