= Menthone =

- l-Menthone

Names
- IUPAC name (2S,5R)-2-Isopropyl-5-methylcyclohexanone
- Other names l-Menthone

Identifiers
CAS Number	14073-97-3
3D model (JSmol)	Interactive image
ChEBI	CHEBI:15410
ChEMBL	ChEMBL276311
ChemSpider	24636
PubChem CID	26447
UNII	5F709W4OG4
CompTox Dashboard (EPA)	DTXSID80859154
- InChI: InChI=1S/C10H18O/c1-7(2)9-5-4-8(3)6-10(9)11/h7-9H,4-6H2,1-3H3/t8-,9+/m1/s1 Key: NFLGAXVYCFJBMK-BDAKNGLRSA-N; InChI=1/C10H18O/c1-7(2)9-5-4-8(3)6-10(9)11/h7-9H,4-6H2,1-3H3/t8-,9+/m1/s1 Key: NFLGAXVYCFJBMK-BDAKNGLRBF
- SMILES: O=C1C[C@H](C)CC[C@H]1C(C)C

Properties
Chemical formula	C_{10}H_{18}O
Molar mass	154.253 g·mol^{−1}
Density	0.895 g/cm^{3}
Melting point	−6 °C (21 °F; 267 K)
Boiling point	207 °C (405 °F; 480 K)
- Except where otherwise noted, data are given for materials in their standard state (at 25 °C [77 °F], 100 kPa). Infobox references

Menthone is a chemical compound of the monoterpene class of naturally occurring organic compounds found in a number of essential oils, one that presents with minty flavor. It is a specific pair of stereoisomers of the four possible such isomers for the chemical structure, 2-isopropyl-5-methylcyclohexanone. Of those, the stereoisoomer l-menthone—formally, the (2S,5R)-trans isomer of that structure, as shown at right—is the most abundant in nature. Menthone is structurally related to menthol, which has a secondary alcohol (>C−OH) in place of the carbon-oxygen double bond (carbonyl group) projecting from the cyclohexane ring.

Menthone is obtained for commercial use after purifying essential oils pressed from Mentha species (peppermint and corn mint). It is used as a flavorant and in perfumes and cosmetics for its characteristic aromatic and minty aroma.

== Occurrence ==
Menthone is a constituent of the essential oils of pennyroyal, peppermint, corn mint, pelargonium geraniums, and other plant species. In most essential oils, it is a minor component. Menthone was first synthesized by oxidation of menthol in 1881, before being found as a component in essential oils in 1891. Of the isomers possible for this chemical structure (see below), the one termed l-menthone—formally, the (2S,5R)-trans-2-isopropyl-5-methylcyclohexanone (see infobox and below)—is the most abundant in nature.

== Physical and sensory properties ==
Menthone is a liquid under standard conditions, and has a density of 0.895 g/cm^{3}. Under the same conditions, the melting point is −6 °C, and its boiling point is 207 °C.

Menthone interacts cognitively with other components in food, drink, and other consumables, to present with what is termed a minty flavor. Pure l-menthone has been described as having an intensely minty clean aroma; in contrast, d-isomenthone has a "green" note, increasing levels of which are perceived to detract from the aroma quality of l-menthone.

== Structure and stereochemistry ==
The structure of 2-isopropyl-5-methylcyclohexanone (menthones and isomenthones, see following) were established historically by establishing identity of natural and synthetic products after chemical synthesis of this structure from other chemical compounds of established structure; these inferential understandings have, in modern organic chemistry, been augmented by supporting mass spectrometric and spectroscopic evidence (e.g., from NMR spectroscopy and circular dichroism) to make the conclusions secure.

The structure 2-isopropyl-5-methylcyclohexanone has two asymmetric carbon centers, one at each attachment point of the two alkyl group substituents, the isopropyl in the 2-position and the methyl in the 5-position of the cyclohexane framework. The spatial arrangement of atoms—the absolute configuration—at these two points are designated by the descriptors R (Latin rectus, right) or S (Latin sinister, left) based on the Cahn–Ingold–Prelog priority rules. Hence, four unique stereoisomers are possible for this structure: (2S,5S), (2R,5S), (2S,5R) and (2R,5R).

The (2S,5S) and (2R,5R) stereoisomers project the isopropyl and methyl groups from the same "side" of the cyclohexane ring, are the so-called cis isomers, and are termed isomenthone; the (2R,5S) and (2S,5R) stereoisomers project the two groups on the opposite side of the ring, are the so-called trans isomers, and are referred to as menthone. Because the (2S,5R) isomer has an observed negative optical rotation, it is called l-menthone or (−)-menthone. It is the enantiomeric partner of the (2R,5S) isomer: (+)- or d-menthone.

=== Interconversion ===
Menthone and isomenthone interconvert easily, the equilibrium favoring menthone; if menthone and isomenthone are equilibrated at room temperature, the isomenthone content will reach 29%. Menthone can easily be converted to isomenthone and vice versa via a reversible epimerization reaction via an enol intermediate, which changes the direction of optical rotation, so that l-menthone becomes d-isomenthone, and d-menthone becomes l-isomenthone.

== Preparation ==
=== Biochemical ===
The enzyme (+)-pulegone reductase from peppermint catalyses a reduction reaction which gives a mixture of (–)-menthone and (+)-isomenthone:

(+)-pulegone
+ NADPH
H^{+}
H^{+}
70% (–)-menthone
+
30% (+)-isomenthone
+ NADP^{+}

It uses nicotinamide adenine dinucleotide phosphate (NADPH) as its cofactor.

=== Chemical ===
Menthone is obtained commercially by fractional crystallization of the oils pressed from peppermint and cornmint, genus Mentha.

In the laboratory, l-menthone may be prepared by oxidation of menthol with acidified dichromate. If the chromic acid oxidation is performed with stoichiometric oxidant in the presence of diethyl ether as co-solvent, a method introduced by H.C. Brown and colleagues in 1971, the epimerization of l-menthone to d-isomenthone is largely avoided.

== History ==
Menthone was first described by Moriya in 1881. It was later synthesized by heating menthol with chromic acid, and its structure was later confirmed by synthesizing it from 2-isopropyl-5-methylpimelic acid.

Menthone was one of the original substrates reported in the discovery of the still widely used synthetic organic chemistry transformation, the Baeyer–Villiger (B–V) oxidation, (Note: Now used substituting organic peracids—for example, peracetic acid or m-chloroperbenzoic acid (m-CPBA), and regularly used in laboratory scale syntheses of "pharmaceutical intermediates, steroids, antibiotics and pheromones".) as reported by Adolf von Baeyer and Victor Villiger in 1899; Baeyer and Villiger noted that menthone reacted with monopersulfuric acid to produce the corresponding oxacycloheptane (oxepane-type) lactone, with an oxygen atom inserted between the carbonyl carbon and the ring carbon attached to the isopropyl substituent.

In 1889, Ernst Beckmann discovered that dissolving menthone in concentrated sulfuric acid gave a new ketonic material which gave an equal but opposite optical rotation to the starting material. Beckmann's inferences from his results situated menthone as a crucial player in a great mechanistic discovery in organic chemistry. Beckmann concluded that the change in structure underlying the observed opposite optical rotation was the result of an inversion of configuration at the asymmetric carbon atom next to the carbonyl group (which, at that time was believed to be the carbon atom attached to the methyl rather than the isopropyl group). He postulated that this occurred through an intermediate enol—a tautomer of the ketone—such that the original absolute configuration of that carbon atom changed as its geometry went from terahedral to trigonal planar. This report is an early example of an inference that an otherwise undetectable intermediate was involved in a reaction mechanism, one that could account for the observed structural outcome of the reaction.

== See also ==
- Piperitone
