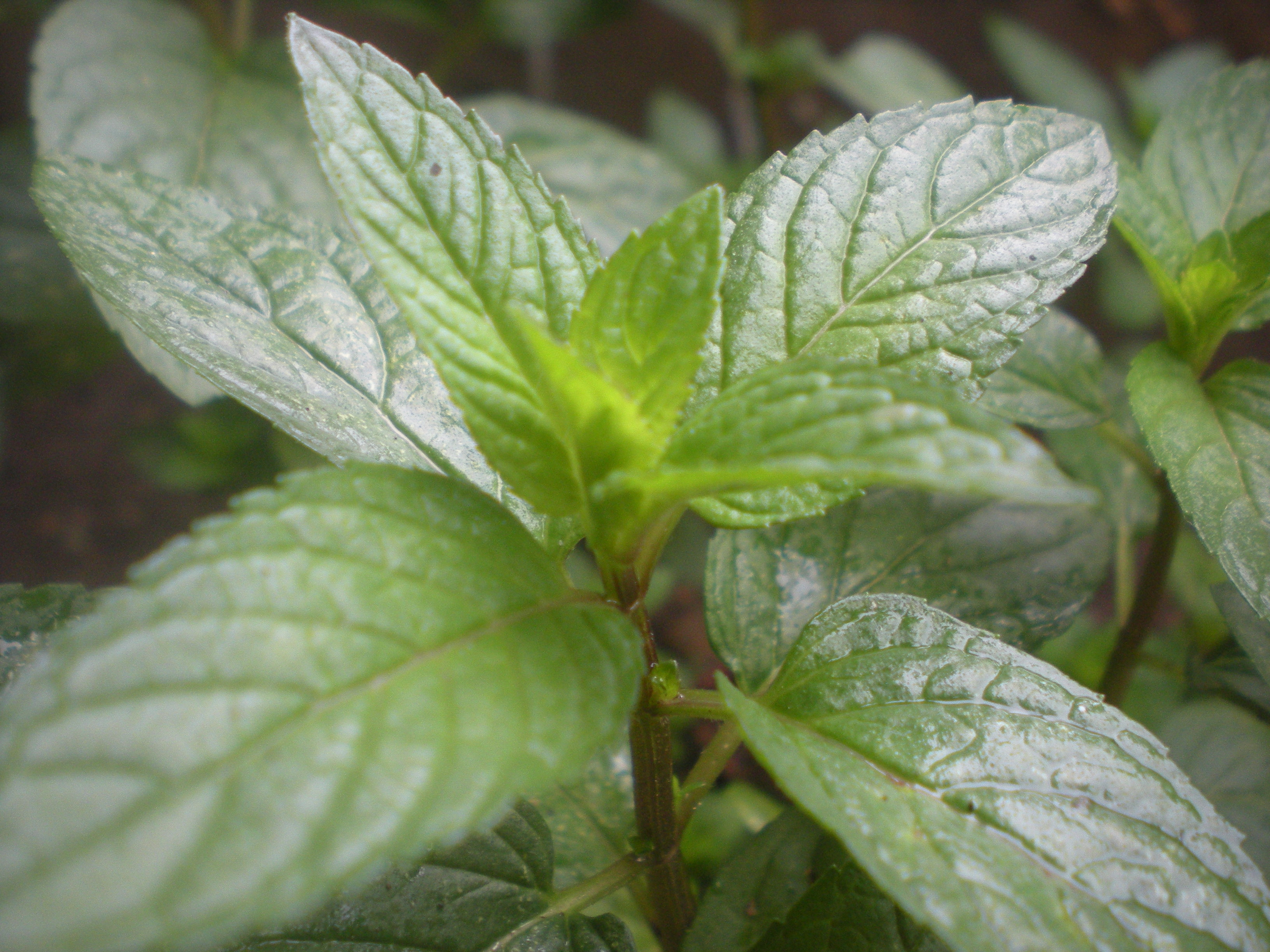

Scientific classification
- Kingdom: Plantae
- Clade: Tracheophytes
- Clade: Angiosperms
- Clade: Eudicots
- Clade: Asterids
- Order: Lamiales
- Family: Lamiaceae
- Genus: Mentha
- Species: M. × piperita

Binomial name
- Mentha × piperita L.

Synonyms
- List: Mentha × odora Salisb.; Mentha × balsamea Willd.; Mentha × banatica Heinr.Braun; Mentha × braousiana Pérard; Mentha × concinna Pérard; Mentha × crispula Wender.; Mentha × durandoana Malinv. ex Batt.; Mentha × exaltata Heinr.Braun; Mentha × fraseri Druce; Mentha × glabra Bellardi ex Colla; Mentha × glabrata Vahl; Mentha × hercynica Röhl.; Mentha × heuffelii Heinr.Braun; Mentha × hircina Hull; Mentha × hircina J.Fraser; Mentha × hirtescens Haw. ex Spach; Mentha × hortensis Ten.; Mentha hortensis var. citrata Ten.; Mentha × hudsoniana Heinr.Braun; Mentha × kahirina Forssk.; Mentha × langii Geiger ex T.Nees; Mentha × napolitana Ten.; Mentha × nigricans Mill.; Mentha × officinalis Hull; Mentha × pimentum Nees ex Bluff & Fingerh.; Mentha × piperoides Malinv.; Mentha × schultzii Boutigny ex F.W.Schultz; Mentha × tenuis Frank ex Benth.

= Peppermint =

Hybrid species of flowering plant

Peppermint (Mentha × piperita) is a hybrid species of mint, a cross between watermint and spearmint. Indigenous to Europe and the Middle East, the plant is now widely spread and cultivated in many regions of the world. It is occasionally found in the wild with its parent species.

Although the genus Mentha comprises more than 25 species, peppermint is the most widely used variant. While Western peppermint is derived from Mentha × piperita, Chinese peppermint, or bohe, is derived from the fresh leaves of M. haplocalyx. M. × piperita and M. haplocalyx are both recognised as plant sources of menthol and menthone, and are among the oldest herbs used for both culinary and medicinal products.

== Botany ==
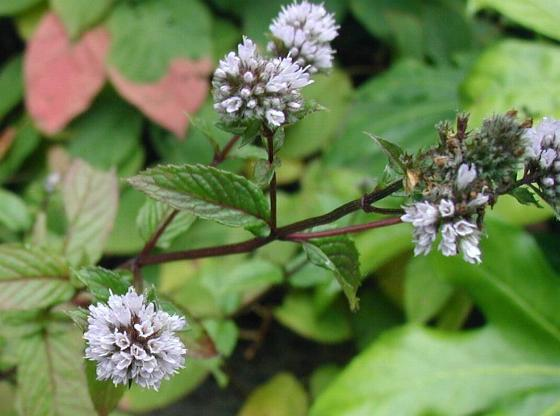
Peppermint flowers

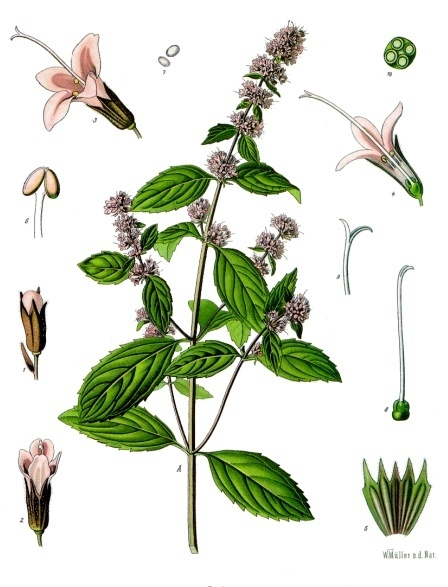
An 1887 illustration from Köhlers; Medicinal Plants

Peppermint was first identified in Hertfordshire, England, by a Dr. Eales, a discovery which John Ray published 1696 in the second edition of his book Synopsis Methodica Stirpium Britannicarum. He initially gave it the name Mentha spicis brevioribus et habitioribus, foliis Mentha fusca, sapore fervido piperis and later in his 1704 volume Historia Plantarum he called it Mentha palustris or Peper–Mint. The plant was then added to the London Pharmacopoeia under the name Mentha piperitis sapore in 1721.

It was given the name Mentha piperita in 1753 by Carl Linnaeus in his Species Plantarum Volume 2. Linnaeus treated peppermint as a species, but it is now agreed to be a hybrid between Mentha aquatica and Mentha spicata, with M. spicata itself also being considered by some authors to be a hybrid between Mentha longifolia and Mentha suaveolens.

Peppermint is a herbaceous, rhizomatous, perennial plant that grows to be 30–90 cm (12–35 in) tall, with smooth stems, square in cross section. The rhizomes are wide-spreading and fleshy, and bear fibrous roots. The leaves can be 4–9 cm (1.6–3.5 in) long and 1.5–4 cm (0.59–1.57 in) broad. They are dark green with reddish veins, with an acute apex and coarsely toothed margins. The leaves and stems are usually slightly fuzzy. The flowers are purple, 6–8 mm (0.24–0.31 in) long, with a four-lobed corolla about 5 mm (0.20 in) diameter; they are produced in whorls (verticillasters) around the stem, forming thick, blunt spikes. Flowering season lasts from mid- to late summer. The chromosome number is variable, with 2n counts of 66, 72, 84, and 120 recorded. Peppermint is a fast-growing plant, spreading quickly once it has sprouted.

== Ecology ==
Peppermint typically occurs in moist habitats, including stream sides and drainage ditches. Being a hybrid, it is usually sterile, producing no seeds and reproducing only vegetatively, spreading by its runners.

Outside of its native range, areas where peppermint was formerly grown for oil often have an abundance of feral plants, and it is considered invasive in Australia, the Galápagos Islands, New Zealand, and the United States in the Great Lakes region, noted since 1843.

== Cultivation ==
Peppermint generally grows best in moist, shaded locations, and expands by underground rhizomes. Young shoots are taken from old stocks and dibbled into the ground about 0.5 m (1.5 ft) apart. They grow quickly and cover the ground with runners if it is permanently moist. For the home gardener, it is often grown in containers to restrict rapid spreading. It grows best with a good supply of water, without being waterlogged, and planted in areas with partial sun to shade.

The leaves and flowering tops are used; they are collected as soon as the flowers begin to open and can be dried. The wild form of the plant is less suitable for this purpose, with cultivated plants having been selected for more and better oil content. They may be allowed to lie and wilt a little before distillation, or they may be taken directly to the still.

=== Cultivars ===
Several cultivars have been selected for garden use:

- Mentha × piperita 'Candymint' has reddish stems.
- Mentha × piperita 'Chocolate Mint'. Its flowers open from the bottom up; its flavour is reminiscent of the flavour in Andes Chocolate Mints, a popular confection.
- Mentha × piperita 'Citrata' includes a number of varieties including Eau de Cologne mint, grapefruit mint, lemon mint, and orange mint. Its leaves are aromatic and hairless.
- Mentha × piperita 'Crispa' has wrinkled leaves.
- Mentha × piperita 'Lavender Mint'
- Mentha × piperita 'Lime Mint' has lime-scented foliage.
- Mentha × piperita 'Variegata' has mottled green and pale yellow leaves.

Commercial cultivars may include:

- Dulgo pole
- Zefir
- Bulgarian population #2
- Clone 11-6-22
- Clone 80-121-33
- Mitcham Digne 38
- Mitcham Ribecourt 19
- 'Todd's Mitcham', a verticillium wilt-resistant cultivar produced from a breeding and test program of atomic gardening at Brookhaven National Laboratory from the mid-1950s
- 'Refined Murray', also verticillium-resistant
- 'Roberts Mitcham', also verticillium-resistant and also the product of mutation breeding

=== Diseases ===
Verticillium wilt is a major constraint in peppermint cultivation. 'Todd's Mitcham', 'Refined Murray', 'Roberts Mitcham' (see above), and a few other cultivars have some degree of resistance.

== Production ==
Peppermint production 2022, in tonnes
Morocco	27,784
Argentina	6,957
Mexico	773
World	35,547
Source: FAOSTAT of the United Nations

In 2023, world production of peppermint was 35,547 tonnes, led by Morocco with 78% of the total and Argentina with 20% (table).

In 2020, Oregon and Washington produced most of American peppermint, the leaves of which are processed for the essential oil to produce flavourings mainly for chewing gum and toothpaste.

== Chemical constituents ==
Peppermint has a high menthol content. Dried peppermint typically has 0.3–0.4% of volatile oil containing menthol (7–48%), menthone (20–46%), menthyl acetate (3–10%), menthofuran (1–17%), and 1,8-cineol (3–6%).

Peppermint contains terpenoids and flavonoids such as eriocitrin, hesperidin, and kaempferol 7-O-rutinoside.

== Oil ==
Peppermint oil has a high concentration of natural pesticides, mainly pulegone found mostly in "M. arvensis var. piperascens" (Mentha canadensis), and to a lesser extent in Mentha × piperita and menthone. It is known to repel some pest insects, including mosquitos.

Main constituents of the essential oil from Mentha × piperita are menthol (41%) and menthone (23%).

The oil is used in flavours and fragrances. Its aroma defines "peppermint".

== Research and health effects ==
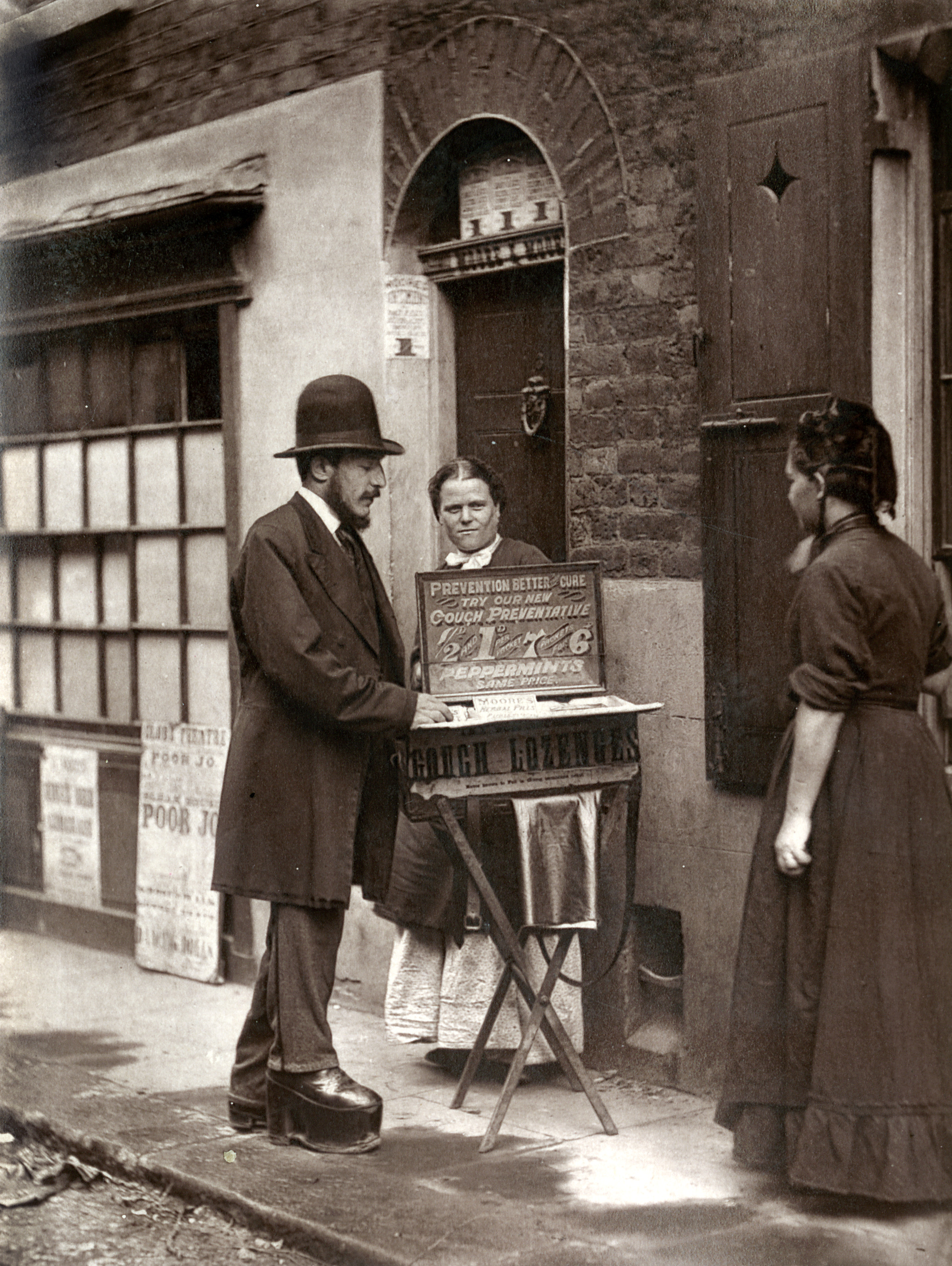
Peppermint throat lozenge, advertised as "prevention better than cure", sold in London in 1877

Peppermint oil is under preliminary research for its potential as a short-term treatment for irritable bowel syndrome. High oral doses of peppermint oil (500 mg) can cause mucosal irritation and mimic heartburn. Peppermint oil capsules are licensed as a medicine in the UK for the treatment of irritable bowel syndrome (IBS).

Preliminary research administering a tiny amount of the oil in order to lower the systolic aspect of blood pressure is in initial human trials in 2026.

Peppermint oil and leaves have a cooling effect when used topically for muscle pain, nerve pain, relief from itching, or as a fragrance.

Peppermint oil had supposed uses in ancient traditional medicine for minor gastrointestinal diseases.

== Culinary and other uses ==
Fresh or dried peppermint leaves are often used alone in peppermint tea or with other herbs in herbal teas (tisanes, infusions). Peppermint is used for flavouring ice cream, candy, fruit preserves, alcoholic beverages, chewing gum, toothpaste, and some shampoos, soaps, and skin care products.

Menthol activates cold-sensitive TRPM8 receptors in the skin and mucosal tissues, and is the primary source of the cooling sensation that follows the topical application of peppermint oil.

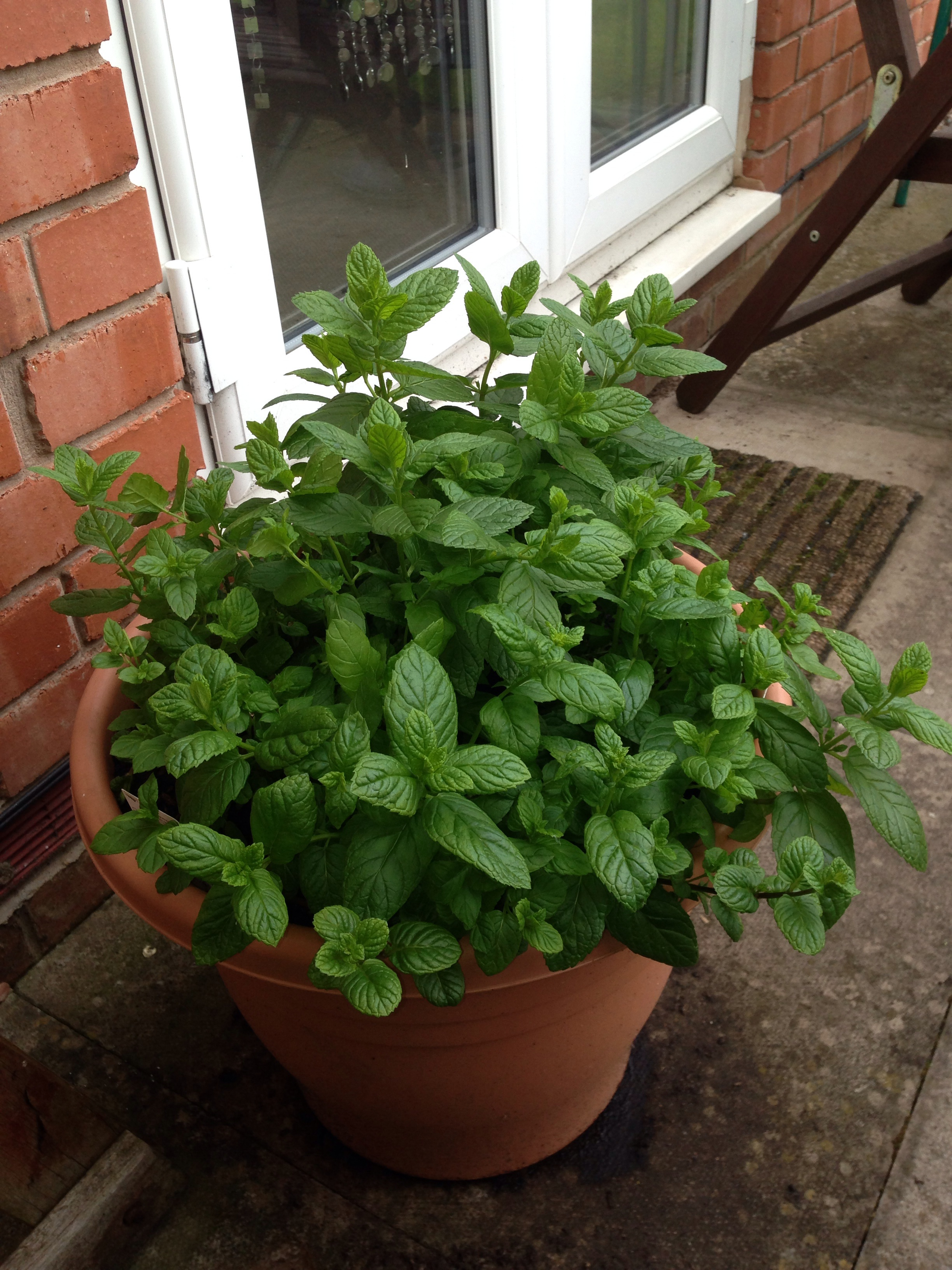
Peppermint grown in a pot outside a house

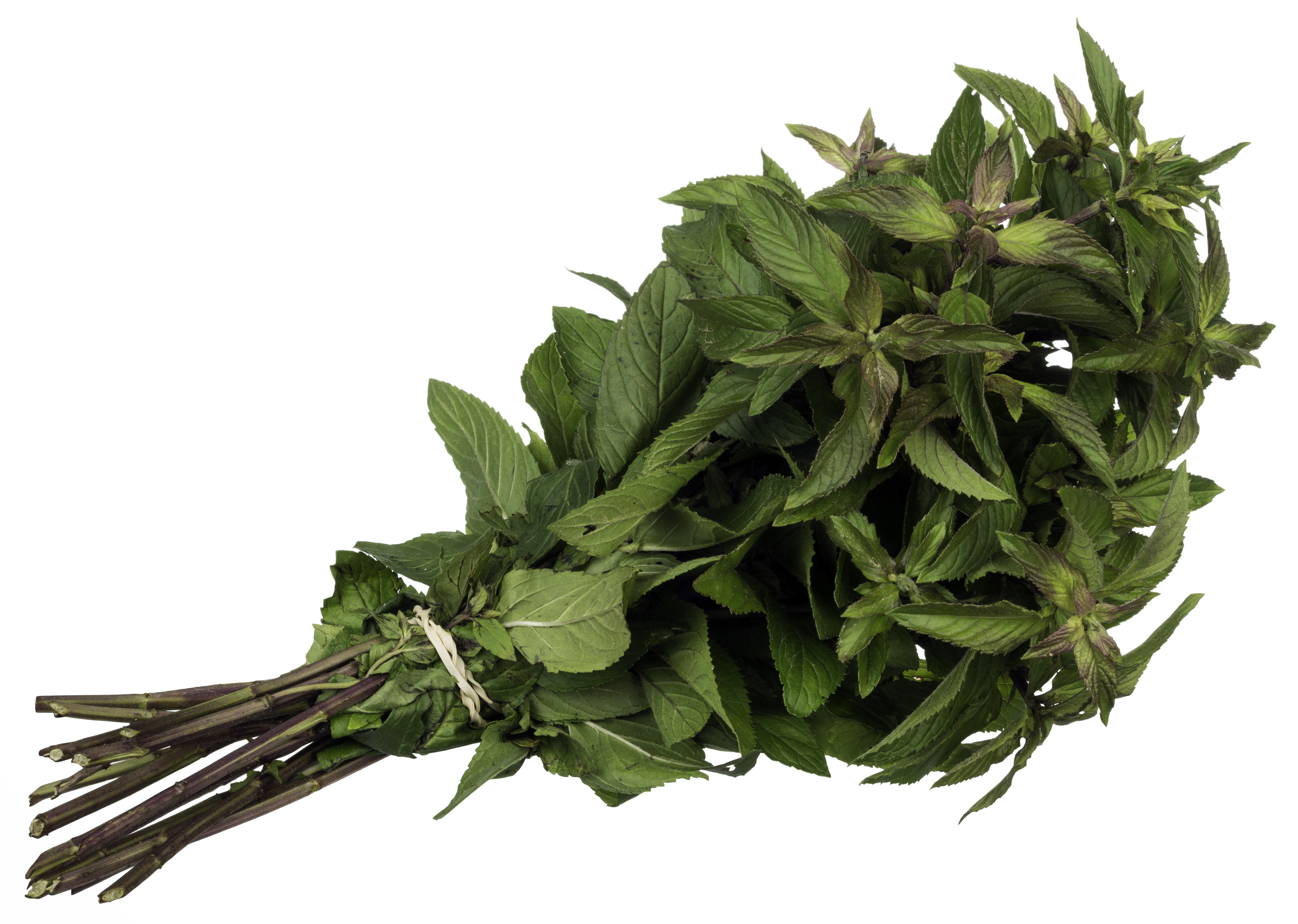
Mentha × piperita hybrid known as 'Chocolate Mint'

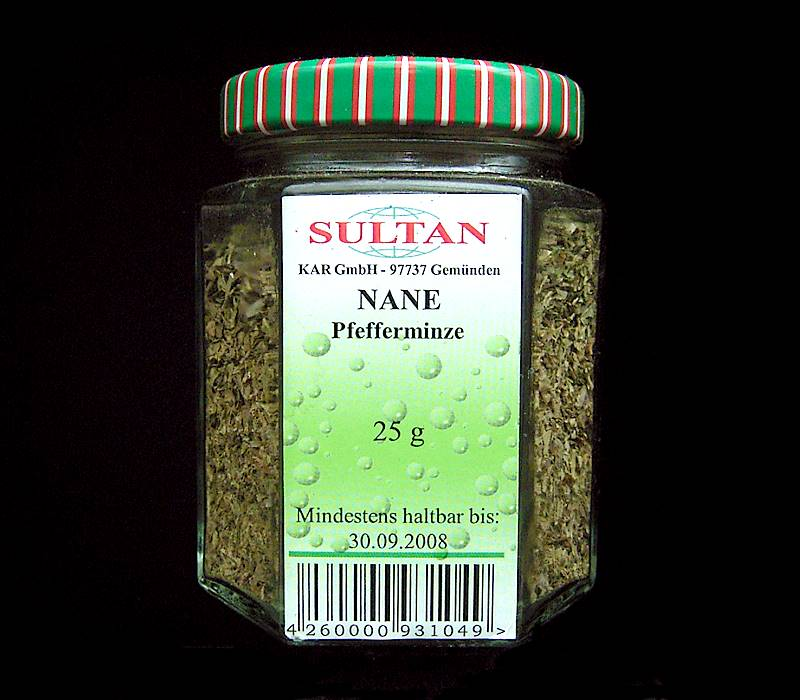
Freeze-dried leaves

Peppermint oil is also used in construction and plumbing to test for the tightness of pipes and disclose leaks by its odour.

== Safety ==
Medicinal uses of peppermint have not been approved as effective or safe by the US Food and Drug Administration. With caution that the concentration of the peppermint constituent pulegone should not exceed 1% (140 mg), peppermint preparations are considered safe by the European Medicines Agency when used in topical formulations for adult subjects. Diluted peppermint essential oil is safe for oral intake when only a few drops are used.

Although peppermint is commonly available as a herbal supplement, no established, consistent manufacturing standards exist for it, and some peppermint products may be contaminated with toxic metals or other substituted compounds. Skin rashes, irritation, or allergic reactions may result from applying peppermint oil to the skin, and its use on the face or chest of young children may cause side effects if the oil menthol is inhaled. A common side effect from oral intake of peppermint oil or capsules is heartburn. Oral use of peppermint products may have adverse effects when used with iron supplements, cyclosporine, medicines for heart conditions or high blood pressure, or medicines to decrease stomach acid.

== Standards ==
- ISO 676:1995 – contains the information about the nomenclature of the variety and cultivars
- ISO 5563:1984 – a specification for its dried leaves of Mentha piperita Linnaeus
- Peppermint oil – ISO 856:2006

== See also ==
- Eucalyptus
- Peppermint angelfish
- Peppermint bark
- Peppermint extract
- Peppermint pig
- Peppermint Soda
- Peppermint stick insect
