= Boulaghmane =

West Saharan barley flour dish

Boulaghmane (Arabic: بلغمان; Hassaniyya: دگيگالمگلي, romanized: dgig lmegli) is a Mauritanian and Western Saharan cuisine dish that consists of toasted barley flour and sugar, which is bound together with either clarified butter, clarified camel hump fat, or a vegetable oil, along with water; the final dish is either served as a paste, or formed into balls. An unleavened and uncooked dish, it is a traditional subsistence food for desert nomads in the Western Sahara and western Mauritania, as well being a common breakfast food for suhoor on Ramadan.

== Preparation and consumption ==
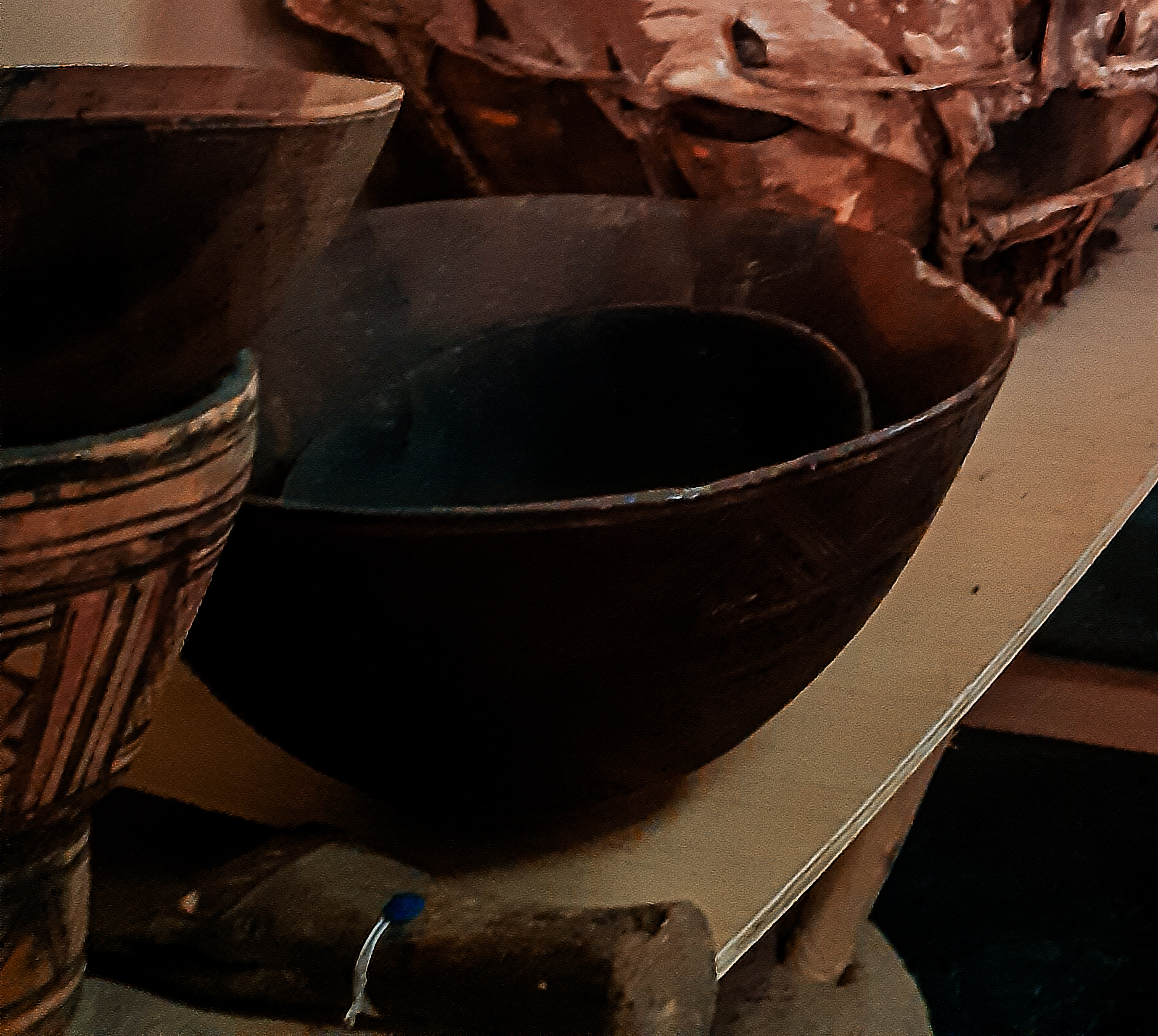
A keddah (Hassaniyya: الكدحة), the bowl typically used for making boulaghmane

The base of Boulaghmane is a toasted barley flour (Hassaniyya: المكلى/أمكلى, romanized: amgli/amagla). The toasted flour is put in a keddah (الكدحة) and mixed with sugar and salt, then water and an oil are added to bind; oils used include the traditional clarified camel hump fat (wadak), clarified butter (dah), and olive oil. The paste may be formed into balls as desire, or left as a paste.

A dish similar to boulaghmane is made in the Sahrawi refugee camps called zammit. This dish omits salt. It was made prior to the Western Sahara War, but has seen a resurgence in recent years amid a growing food crisis in the refugee camps, incentivizing such a subsistence food. The same combination of ingredients can be used to make labsis, a further boulaghmane variant of a different consistency; labsis is typically eaten for breakfast.

Both boulaghmane and zammit are considered prime traveller's foods, as they are quick to prepare, keep well and slake thirst; it is also made for people on a diet to reduce stomach fat. Boulaghmane and zammit are most often eaten for suhoor, the meal before the daily fast on Ramadan, along with Maghrebi mint tea and zrig. Boulaghmane can be combined with milk and fruit to make a drink for suhoor as well.

== See also ==
- Bsisa
- Bazin (bread)
