= Mint tea =

Mint tea may refer to:

- Maghrebi mint tea, an infusion of leaves of tea plants with mint added as a flavoring
- Mint herbal tea, an infusion of leaves of mint plants
