= Zrig =

Saharan sour milk drink

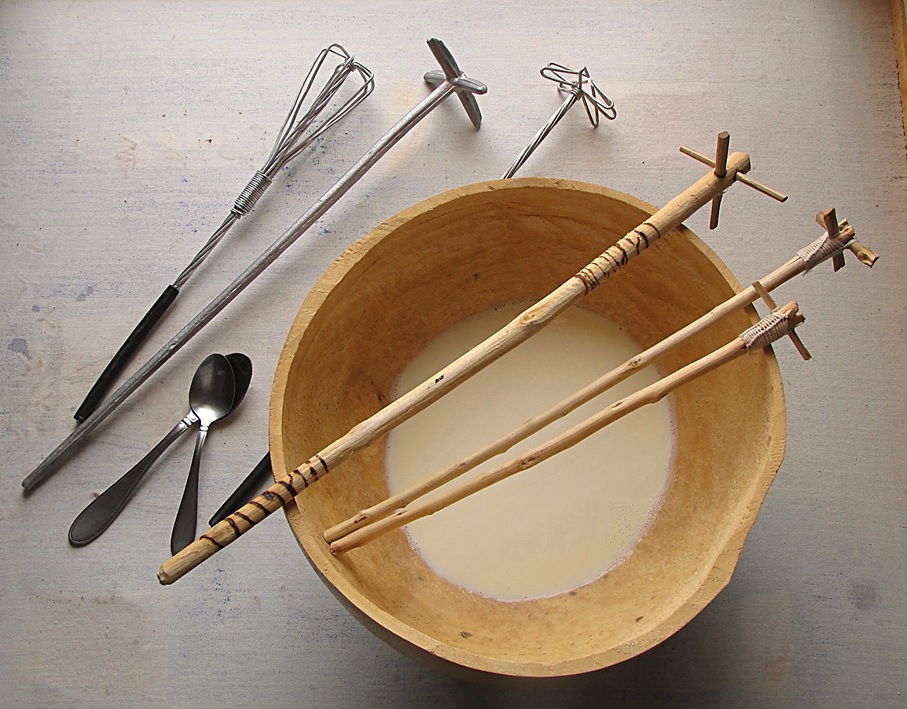
- Sour milk (French: lait caillé) in a calabash bowl, with Senegalese stirring sticks
- Alternative names: madhaq; šnīn; senguetti; toufam
- Type: Fermented milk
- Course: Beverage
- Place of origin: Mauritania
- Associated cuisine: Mauritanian cuisine
- Main ingredients: Sour milk, sugar, water
- Variations: Maize flour; Millet; Orange soda; Chili pepper
- Similar dishes: Kefir; Lassi; Leben

Zrig (Hassaniyya: زريق or زريك, zrik; Fula: toufam) (Note: Other regional names include الشنين šnīn (Adrar region);, المذق, madhaq) is a fermented milk beverage of the west Sahara. A traditional drink of Mauritanian, Senegalese and Western Saharan cuisine, zrig is made from soured milk (French: lait caillé) mixed with sugar and cut with water; regional variants include additions of flavorings and grains. Zrig is one of the main beverages offered to guest along with Maghrebi mint tea (Hassaniyya: attai). It is valued for being refreshing in the Saharan climate, and is traditionally consumed at the beginning of iftar during Ramadan.

== Preparation ==
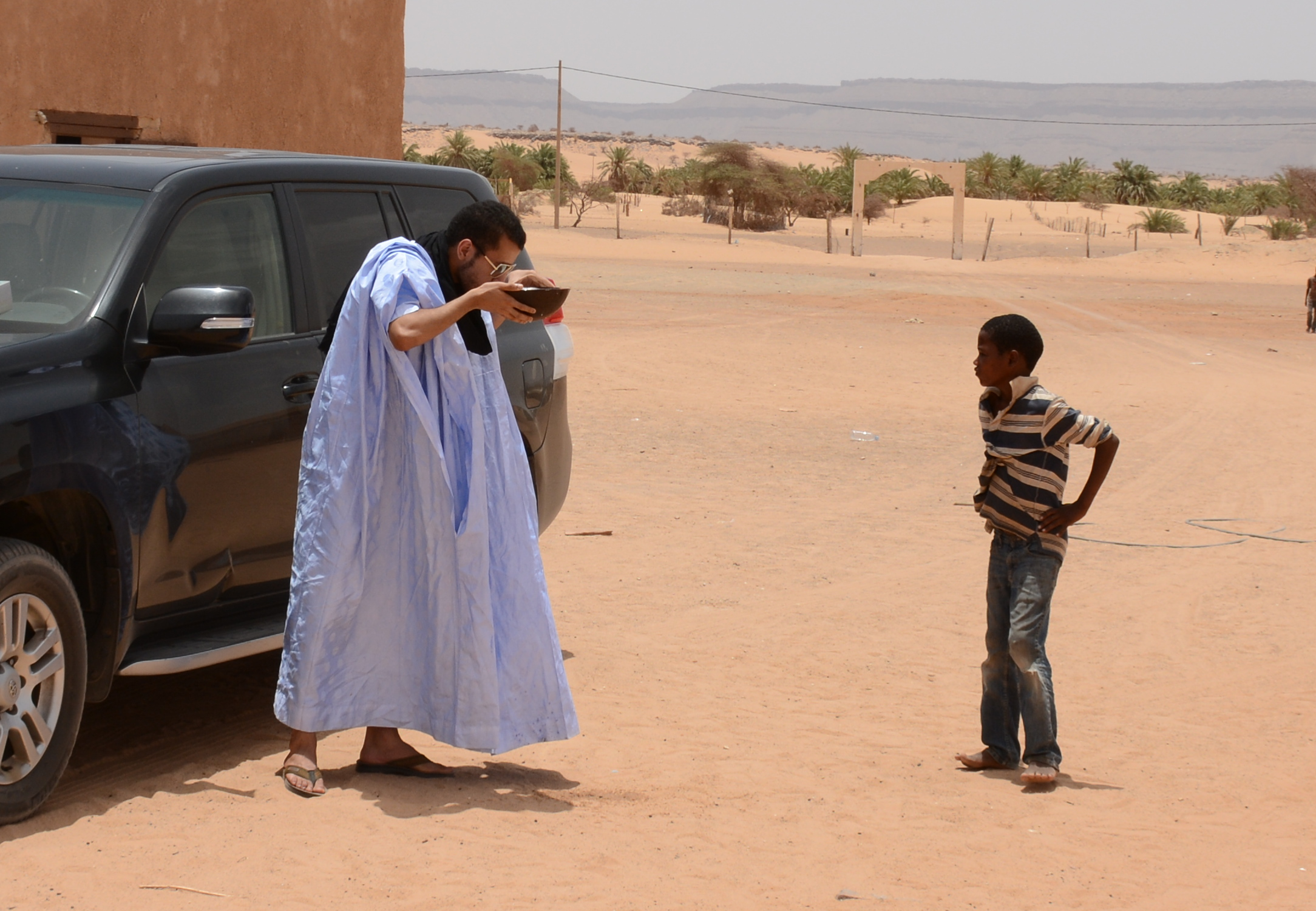
Visitor presented with a gdah of zrig by a child in Atar, Mauritania

Zrig is made from sour milk mixed with sugar and then cut with water. In Senegal, cow milk is typically used; in Mauritania and Western Sahara, camel milk or goat milk is also used. Powdered milk (selya, mew) is also used. The milk is soured over the course of four or five hours, then strained - traditionally through goatskin - and mixed with water and sugar by rolling the mixture between two bowls.

Multiple regional variations exist for zrig. A variant called senguetti (Soninke for 'Chinguetti') from Hodh Ech Chargui includes toasted or mehraz-ground millet; in Oualata, chili pepper is added, due to Malian cuisine influence. In Western Saharan cuisine, roasted maize flour is added. Modern zrig, especially in cities, may be mixed with other beverages like orange soda for flavor.

== Consumption and culture ==
Zrig is typically consumed as a breakfast beverage before tea, as a thirst quencher during the daytime heat, and when showing hospitality to guests. It is traditionally drank from a gdah, a traditionally carved wooden bowl, or drank from a calabash jug directly. It is a typical drink during iftar during Ramadan, to break the fast before drinking the traditional three cups of Maghrebi mint tea.

In Mauritania, the majority of Haratin own little livestock, so milk consumption is more typical of Beidane. Preparing the curdled milk to produce zrig is a woman's job; the first time a woman makes curdled milk for the family is a significant rite of passage (el-marwab). Urban dwellers would historically engage in medical tourism, living in the countryside with herders in the wintertime to eat more milk, aiming to improve their diet.

=== Use in lebhlouh ===
Zrig is used in the practice of leblouh, the force-feeding of young Mauritanian women to promote aesthetic obesity. Girls are forced to drink gallons of zrig each day along with other foods to induce weight gain.

== History ==
Zrig is an ancient part of west Saharan culture, owing to the scant resources and reliance on animal products for the region. Milk being a major food source, zrig developed both a preservation technique as well as a way to stretch the milk out by watering it down. The drink is descended from Arabian lben. The drink has been a longtime part of iftar during Ramadan.

In his travels in the mid-14th century, explorer Ibn Battuta documented that he was given a beverage of sour milk, millet and honey cut with water when he visited the town of Oualata, Mauritania. Iben Batuta also documented two similar drinks that he identified as "daknu," a Hassaniya Arabic term: in Djenné, he had iftar with a Maghrebi Arab that gave him a drink made from water, honey and millet flour mixed with very hard cheese; and when he was traveling along the Niger River from Timbuktu to Gao, he was given a beverage made from water, ground sorghum, honey and sour milk. These latter drinks are similar to 'doon,' a sour milk drink from the Sahel.
