= Economy of Western Sahara =

Economy of a territory in northwestern Africa

- Currency: Moroccan Dirham (MAD) de facto
- Fiscal year: calendar year
- Trade organisations: Morocco claims and occupies most of Western Sahara, so trade partners are included in overall Moroccan accounts. The Sahrawi Arab Democratic Republic laying claim to the territory has ratified AEC treaty, but is not active.

Statistics
- GDP: $908.9 million (2007 est)
- GDP per capita: 2,500 (2007 est)
- Labour force: 144,000 (2012)
- Labour force by occupation: agriculture (50%), services (50%)
- Main industries: Phosphates, fishing

External
- Export goods: phosphates 62%
- Import goods: fuel for fishing fleet, foodstuffs

Public finance
- Government debt: N/A
- All values, unless otherwise stated, are in US dollars.

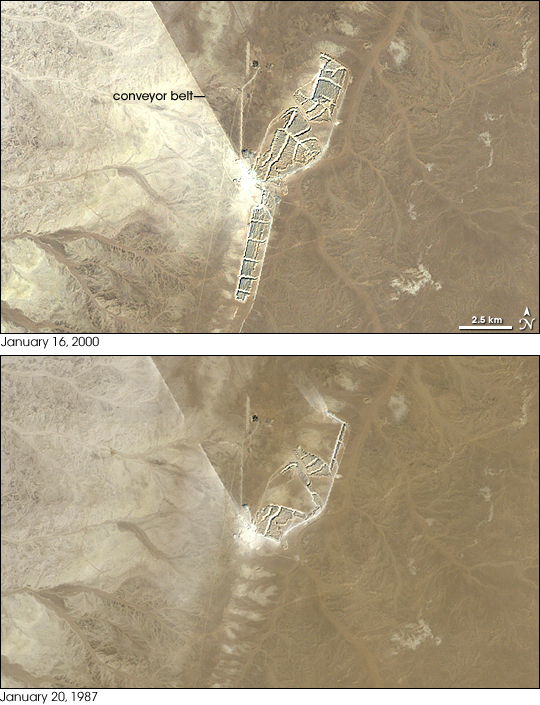
Bou Craa phosphate mine 100 kilometers (about 60 miles) from the coastal city of El Aaiún, Western Sahara. Two Landsat images show growth of the mine between 1987 and 2000.

The majority of the territory of Western Sahara is currently occupied by the Kingdom of Morocco. As such, the majority of the economic activity of Western Sahara happens in the framework of the economy of Morocco.

In the Moroccan-occupied territory, fishing and phosphate mining are the principal sources of income for the population. The territory lacks sufficient rainfall for sustainable agricultural production; hence, most of the food for the urban population must be imported. Trade and other economic activities are controlled by the Moroccan government.

The Free Zone (POLISARIO-administered territory) is mainly uninhabited. There is practically no economical infrastructure and the main activity is camel herding nomadism. The government-in-exile of the Polisario Front had also signed contracts for oil exploration, but there is no practical work, because the zones given are in the Moroccan-occupied part of the territory.

Key agricultural products from Western Sahara include fruits and vegetables (grown in the few oases), as well as camels, sheep and goats. Fishing and oil exploration contracts concerning Western Sahara are sources of political tension.

In 2024, the European Court of Justice ruled that products harvested in Western Sahara and imported into the European Union must be labeled with their territory of origin, rather than as Moroccan.

== Energy consumption ==
- Electricity – production: 90 million kWh (all estimates are for 2014)
- Electricity – consumption: 83.7 million kWh
- Oil – production: 0 barrels per day (0 m^{3}/d)
- Oil – consumption: 1,700 barrels per day (270 m^{3}/d)

== Disputes over natural resources ==
Fishing and oil exploration contracts concerning Western Sahara are sources of political tension. In 2015, a European court invalidated a trade deal between the European Union (EU) and Morocco that involved Western Sahara, prompting a diplomatic backlash from Morocco. In 2018, the European Court of Justice ruled that a fishing treaty between the EU and the Moroccan government did not include fishing grounds off the coast of Western Sahara. In April 2010, the Norwegian state-owned salmon company EWOS stopped the purchases of fish oil from Western Sahara and Morocco (with an amount of around 10 million euros annually, and estimated between 12,000 and 20,000 tons of fish oil in total), for "not being in line with the Norwegian authorities' recommendations".

In 2002, the petroleum companies TotalEnergies and Kerr-McGee were awarded contracts to explore for oil in the region. In December 2004, French oil company TotalEnergies decided not to renew their license off Western Sahara. In May 2006, Kerr-McGee decided to not renew the contract signed with the Moroccan Authorities. The US-based firm Kosmos Energy began a contract to explore offshore from Western Sahara in 2013, prompting criticism from activist groups such as Western Sahara Resource Watch. Desertec, a Munich-based solar energy company, declined to place a plant in Western Sahara for "reputational reasons."

== See also ==
- Legal status of Western Sahara
- Western Saharan cuisine
