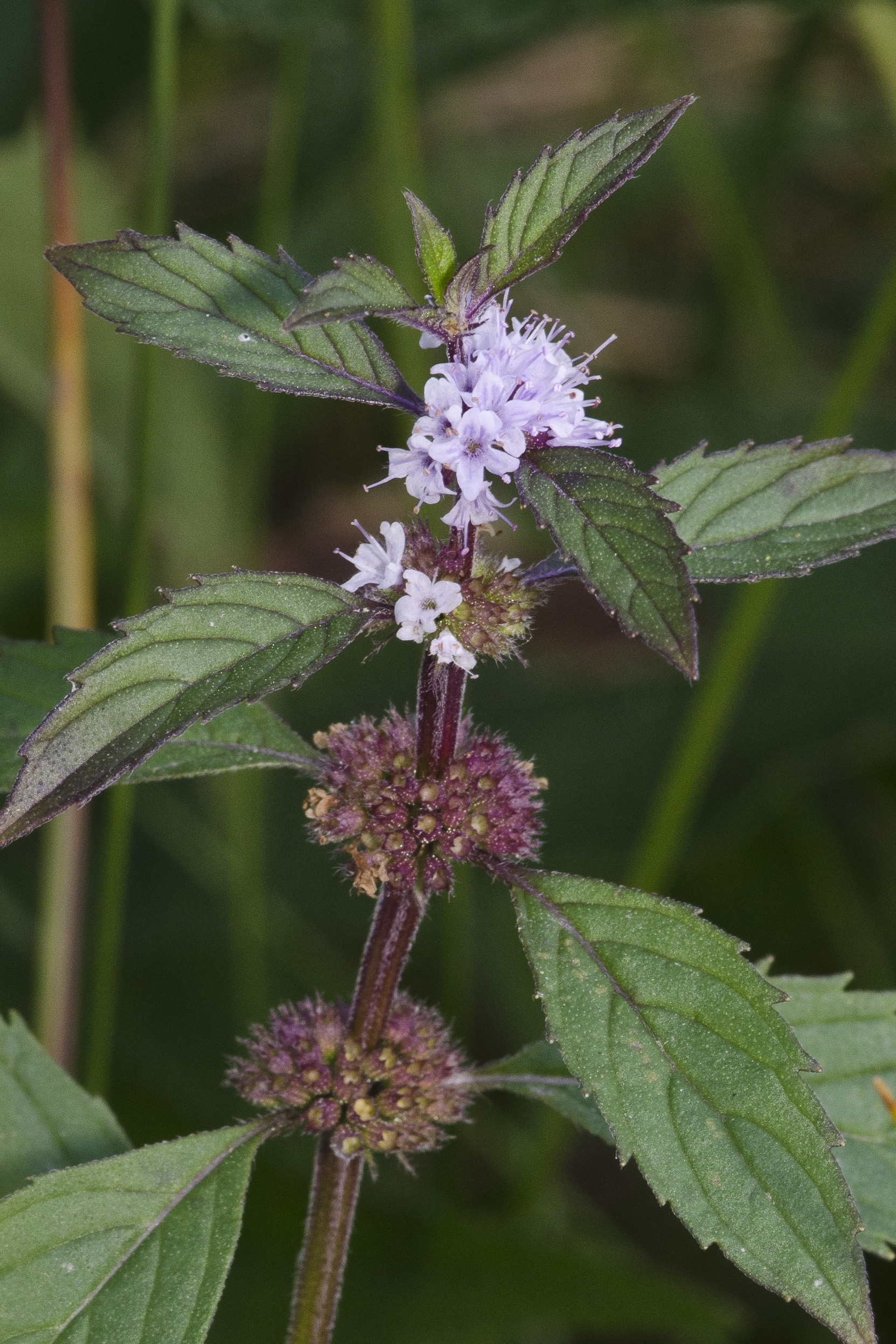

Conservation status
- Secure (NatureServe)

Scientific classification
- Kingdom: Plantae
- Clade: Embryophytes
- Clade: Tracheophytes
- Clade: Spermatophytes
- Clade: Angiosperms
- Clade: Eudicots
- Clade: Asterids
- Order: Lamiales
- Family: Lamiaceae
- Genus: Mentha
- Species: M. canadensis

Binomial name
- Mentha canadensis L.

Synonyms
- List: Mentha agrestis Raf.; Mentha arvensis var. borealis (Michx.) Kuntze; Mentha arvensis subsp. borealis Taylor & MacBryde; Mentha arvensis var. canadensis (L.) Briq.; Mentha arvensis var. canadensis (L.) Kuntze; Mentha arvensis var. glabrata (Benth.) Fernald; Mentha arvensis var. haplocalyx (Briq.) Briq.; Mentha arvensis subsp. haplocalyx Briq.; Mentha arvensis var. lanata Piper; Mentha arvensis var. pavoniana Briq.; Mentha arvensis var. penardi Briq.; Mentha arvensis f. piperascens Malinv. ex Holmes; Mentha arvensis var. sachalinensis Briq.; Mentha arvensis var. schmitzii Briq.; Mentha arvensis var. villosa (Benth.) S.R. Stewart; Mentha arvensis var. zollingeri Briq.; Mentha borealis Michx.; Mentha canadensis var. borealis (Michx.) Piper; Mentha canadensis var. glabrata Benth.; Mentha canadensis var. glabrior Hook.; Mentha canadensis var. lanata (Piper) J.K. Henry; Mentha canadensis var. lanata (Piper) Piper; Mentha canadensis var. villosa Benth.; Mentha ciliata Raf.; Mentha cinerea Raf.; Mentha disperma Sessé́ & Moc.; Mentha glabrior (Hook.) Rydb.; Mentha hakka Siebold; Mentha haplocalyx Briq.; Mentha haplocalyx subsp. austera Briq.; Mentha haplocalyx var. barbata Nakai; Mentha haplocalyx var. nipponensis Matsum. & Kudo ex Kudo; Mentha haplocalyx subsp. pavoniana Briq.; Mentha haplocalyx var. piperascens (Malinv.) Wu and Li; Mentha javanica Blume; Mentha lanata (Piper) Rydb.; Mentha nipponensis Kudo; Mentha occidentalis Rydb.; Mentha penardi (Briq.) Rydb.; Mentha rubella Rydb.; Mentha sachalinensis (Briq.) Kudo; Mentha terebinthinacea Willd. ex Steud.; Mentha trachiloma Raf. (incomplete list)

= Mentha canadensis =

Species of flowering plant

Mentha canadensis is a species of mint native to North America (from the Northwest Territories to central Mexico) and the eastern part of Asia (from Siberia to Java). In North America, it is commonly known as Canada mint, American wild mint, and in Asia as Chinese mint, Sakhalin mint, Japanese mint, and East Asian wild mint. The flowers are bluish or have a slight violet tint. The plant is upright, growing to about 30–60 cm (12–24 in) tall. The leaves are opposite, and flower clusters appear in the upper leaf axils. This mint grows in wet areas but not directly in water, so it will be found near marshes, and lake and river edges. Plants bloom from July to August in their native habitats.

Some populations found in eastern Asia have been distinguished as Mentha sachalinensis, but this is treated as a synonym of M. canadensis by the Plants of the World Online database.

== Description ==
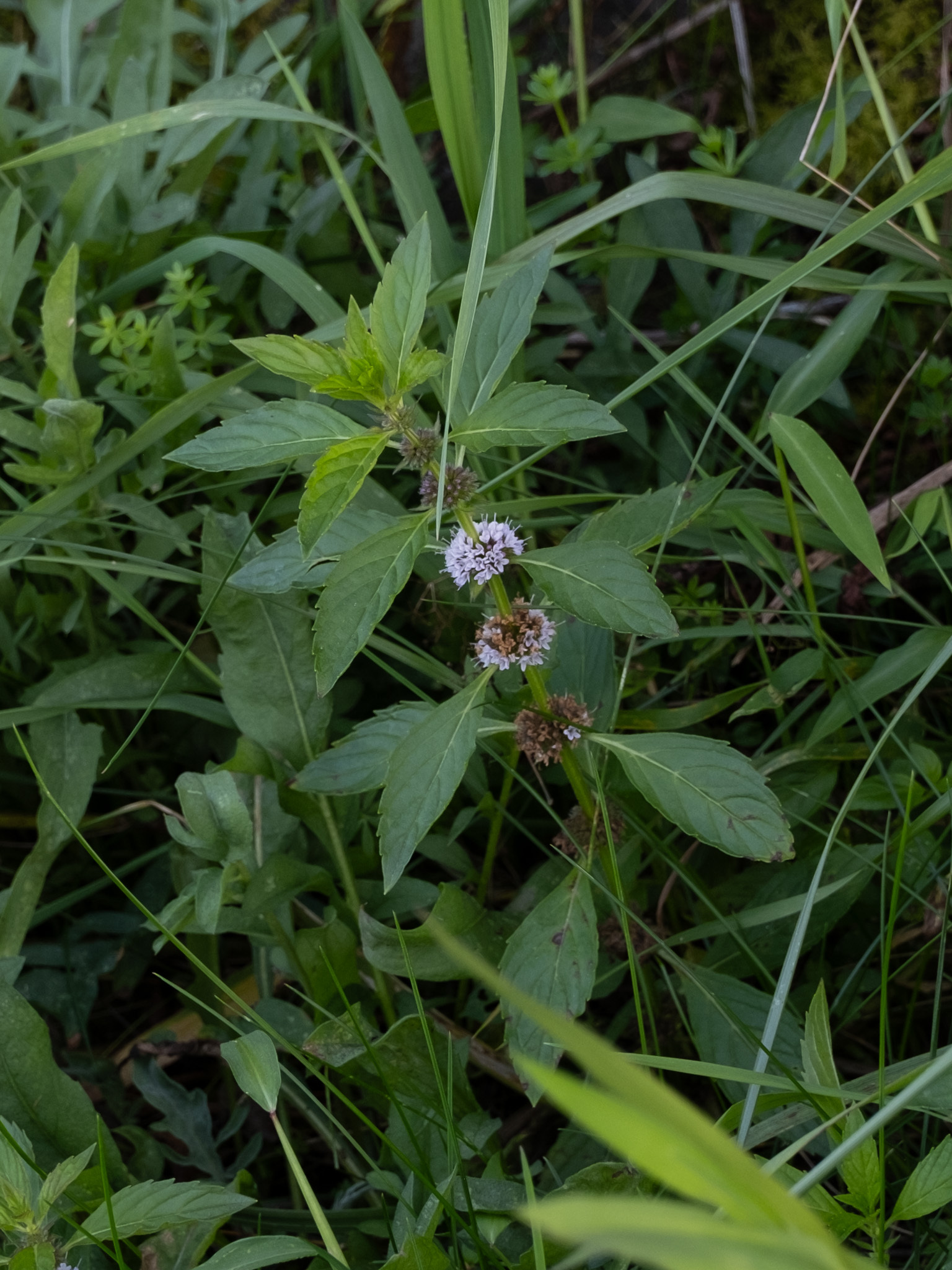
Wild mint in Shenandoah National Park

Mentha canadensis is a perennial plant with an underground creeping rhizome and upright, much-branched shoots. It can grow to a height of about 60 centimetres (24 in). It has finely hairy stems bearing opposite pairs of leaves. Each leaf is borne on a short stalk and has a wedge-shaped base and is lanceolate or ovate, with a toothed margin and a hairy surface. The flowers are borne in spikes at the tips of the shoots. The flowers may be bluish, pink or white. They are arranged in a spiral around the inflorescence. Each flower has five sepals, four petals, four stamens and a superior ovary. The fruit is dry, and splits open when ripe releasing the two seeds.

== Taxonomy ==
Mentha canadensis was first described by Carl Linnaeus in 1753. It has been described since under a large number of synonyms, including as varieties or subspecies of M. arvensis, some of which, such as M. arvensis var. sachalinensis Briq., were subsequently raised to the status of a full species. Thus the Flora of China, in a volume published in 1994, lists M. canadensis and M. sachalinensis as separate species, distinguishing them on the basis of features such as degree of branching, hairiness and leaf shape. More recent sources treat M. canadensis as a single variable species with many synonyms and a wide distribution in North America and eastern temperate and tropical Asia.

Mentha canadensis is an amphidiploid with 2n = 96 chromosomes. It is believed to be derived from ancient hybridization between M. arvensis (2n = 72) and M. longifolia (2n = 24).

== Distribution ==
Mentha canadensis has been found as a native species of mint around the world. Below is a detailed list of countries and states in which Mentha canadensis is considered to be native.

Asia (both temperate and tropical)

- East Asia: China; Japan( Hokkaido, Honshu, Kyushu and Shikoku); Korea
- Russian Far East: Russian Federation (Kurile Islands, Khabarovsk, Primorye, Amur and Sakhalin)
- Siberia: Russian Federation (Buryatia, Tuva, Yakutia-Sakha, Krasnoyarsk, Chita and Irkutsk)
- Indian Subcontinent: India; Nepal; Sri Lanka
- Indo-China: Cambodia; Laos; Myanmar; Thailand; Vietnam
- Malesia: Indonesia; Malaysia; Philippines

Northern America

- Eastern Canada: Canada (Quebec, Nova Scotia, Ontario, Prince Edward Island, New Brunswick and Newfoundland)
- North-Central U.S.: United States (Illinois, Iowa, Kansas, Minnesota, Missouri, Nebraska, North Dakota, Oklahoma, South Dakota, Wisconsin)
- Northeastern U.S.: United States (Connecticut, Indiana, Maine, Massachusetts, Michigan, New Hampshire, New Jersey, New York, Ohio, Pennsylvania, Rhode Island, Vermont and West Virginia)
- Northwestern U.S.: United States (Colorado, Idaho, Montana, Oregon, Washington and Wyoming)
- South-Central U.S.: United States (New Mexico and Texas)
- Southeastern U.S.: United States (Kentucky, Maryland, North Carolina, Tennessee and Virginia)
- Southwestern U.S.: United States (Arizona, California, Nevada, Utah)
- Subarctic America: Canada (Northwest Territory and Yukon); United States (Alaska)
- Western Canada: Canada (Saskatchewan, Alberta, Manitoba and British Columbia)

=== Cultivation ===
Mentha canadensis is cultivated throughout the world:

- Africa
  - Angola, South Africa, Seychelles
- Asia
  - China, Japan, Korea, Taiwan, India, Thailand, New Zealand
- North America
  - Mexico, United States
- South America
  - Brazil, Cuba, Argentina

== Uses ==
It is grown in Hungary for essential oil and menthol production. It also contains a significant amount of pulegone.

The leaves have a distinct peppermint smell when pinched or crushed as the plant contains aromatic oils. The leaves can be picked at any time during plant growth, and may be dried. They are used in making mint jelly, mint tea, and mint leaf candy. First nations people use mint tea for bad breath or toothache, or to cure hiccups. The mint can also be used for fox or lynx bait.

Mint essential oil is known to be effective as insect repellent for insects such as Drosophila melanogaster.

== Medicinal uses ==
One of the most important essential oils used in medicine is Japanese mint oil. Mentha canadensis is rich in natural menthol compared to other mint species, and menthol is used extensively in a number of pharmaceutical preparations. Approximately 4000 tons of Japanese mint oil and 2000 tons of menthol were produced in the world in 1998. The major producing countries are Brazil, Paraguay, Taiwan, Japan, China, India, and Thailand.
