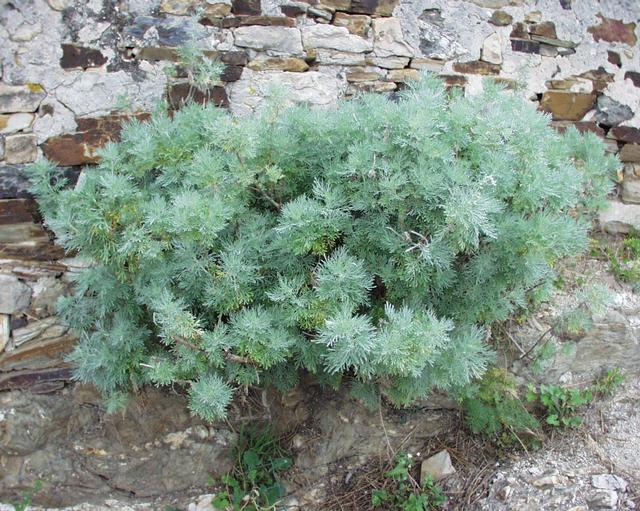

Scientific classification
- Kingdom: Plantae
- Clade: Embryophytes
- Clade: Tracheophytes
- Clade: Spermatophytes
- Clade: Angiosperms
- Clade: Eudicots
- Clade: Asterids
- Order: Asterales
- Family: Asteraceae
- Genus: Artemisia
- Species: A. arborescens

Binomial name
- Artemisia arborescens L.

Synonyms
- Absinthium arborescens Moench; Absinthium arborescens Vaill.; Artemisia argentea Willk. & Lange; Artemisia elegans Salisb.

= Artemisia arborescens =

Species of flowering plant

Artemisia arborescens, the tree wormwood, is a species of flowering plant in the family Asteraceae, native to the Mediterranean region. It is an erect evergreen perennial, with masses of finely-divided aromatic silvery-white leaves and single-sided sprays of yellow daisy-like flowers. This plant is cultivated for its foliage effects, but in colder temperate regions it requires the protection of a wall.

The specific epithet arborescens means "woody" or "tree-like".

This plant and the cultivar 'Powis Castle' have gained the Royal Horticultural Society's Award of Garden Merit.

'Powis Castle' is relatively compact, and unlike typical A. arborescens, it rarely flowers. It has a strong sweet smell, quite different from that of A. arborescens. It has been suggested to be a hybrid between A. arborescens and A. absinthium, but is probably a form from the Middle East where arborescems and absinthium appear to intergrade. The original source is unknown, but British gardener Jim Hancock took a cutting of a plant that he found growing during a garden visit in Yorkshire c. 1968, and took it to Powis Castle when he became Head Gardener there in 1972. It was later named from that garden, propagated and sold to promote the National Trust gardens.

This plant, like others of the genus Artemisia, yields essential oils which have historically been used for various medicinal purposes, and its pharmacological properties are under investigation. It also has culinary uses, including as a substitute for or supplement to spearmint in Maghrebi mint tea during the winter (when mint is out of season), imparting a bitter flavor.

== Gallery ==
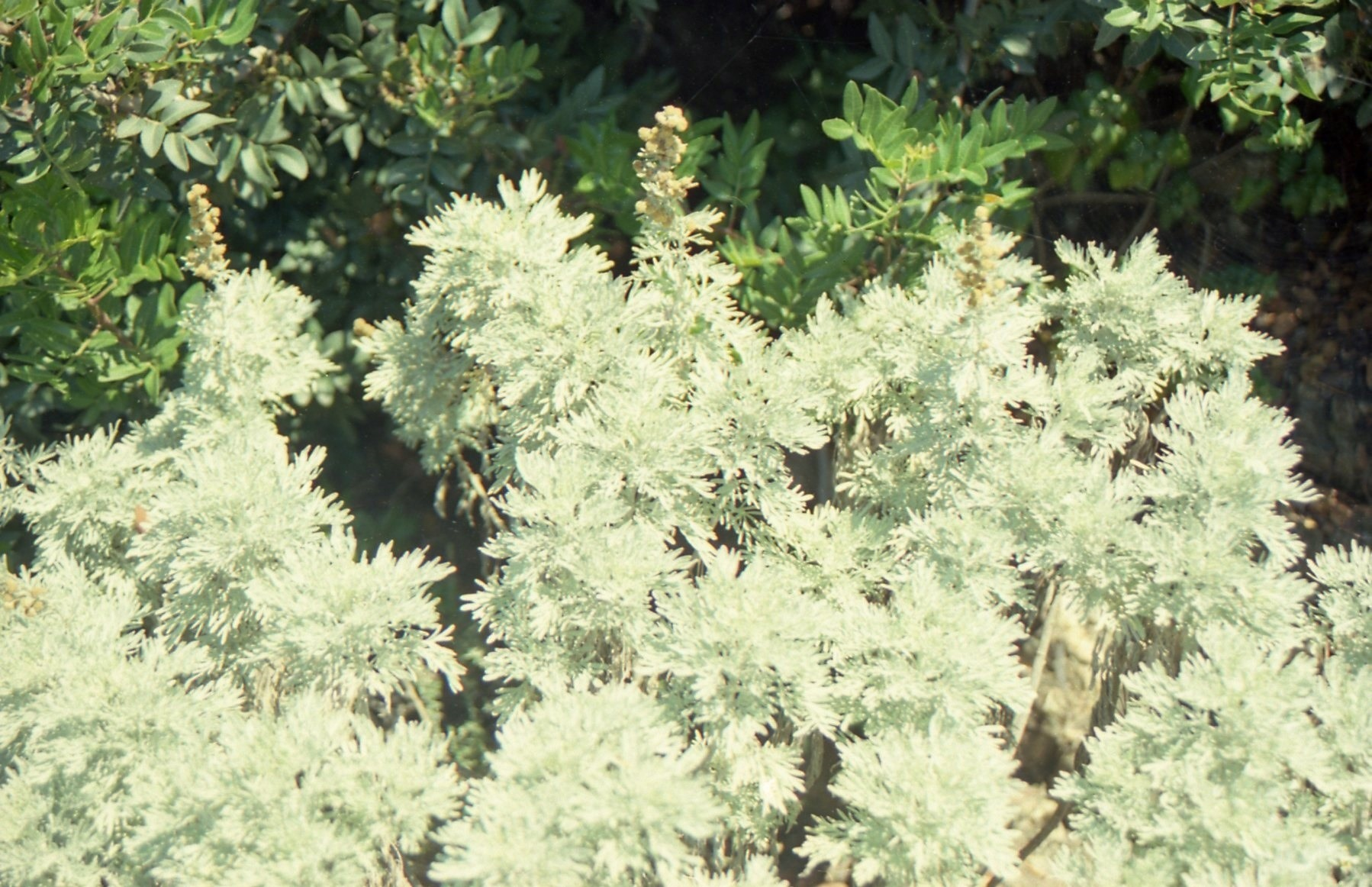

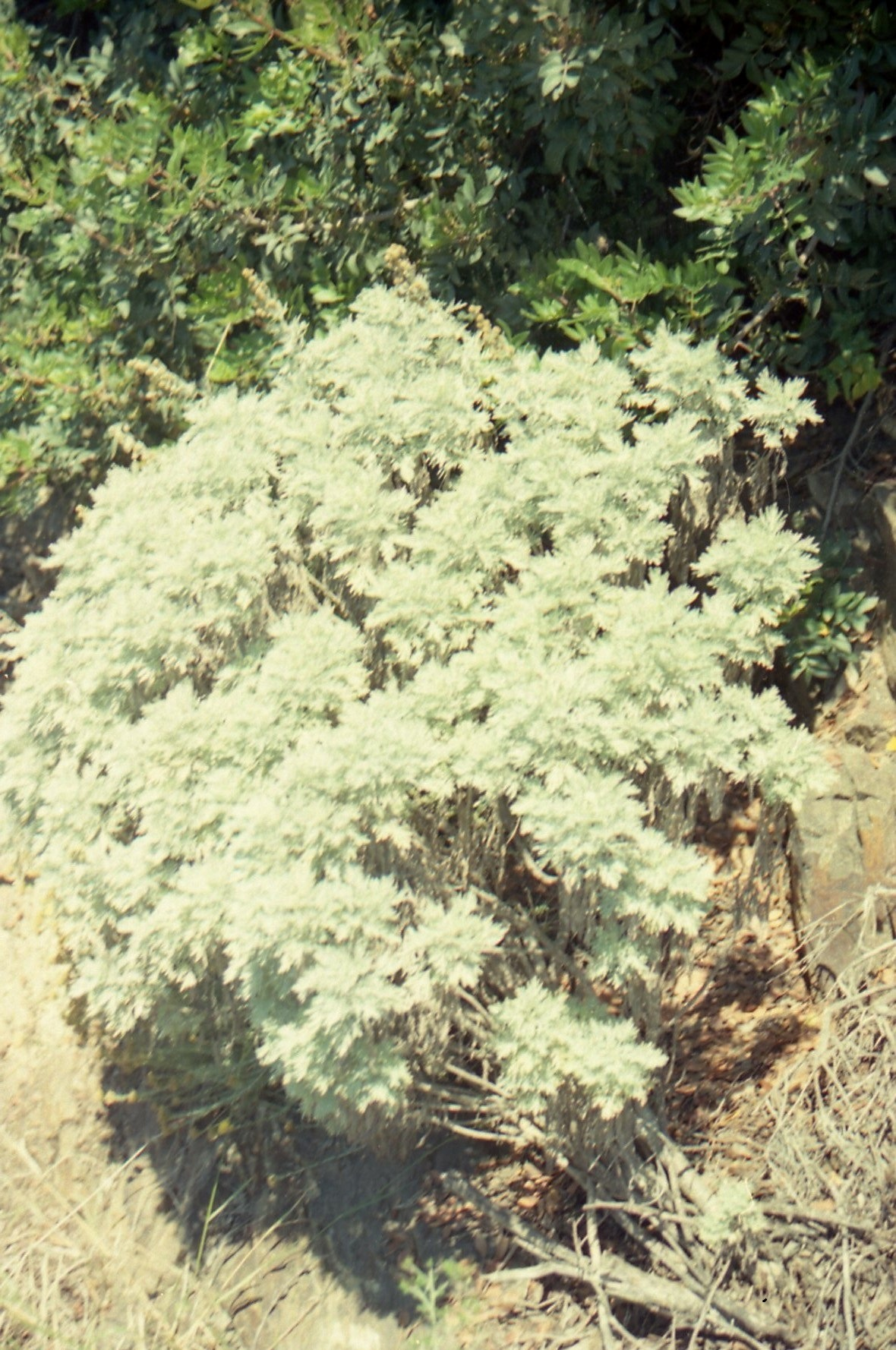
