= Mint tea (herbal tea) =

Tea made by infusing mint leaves

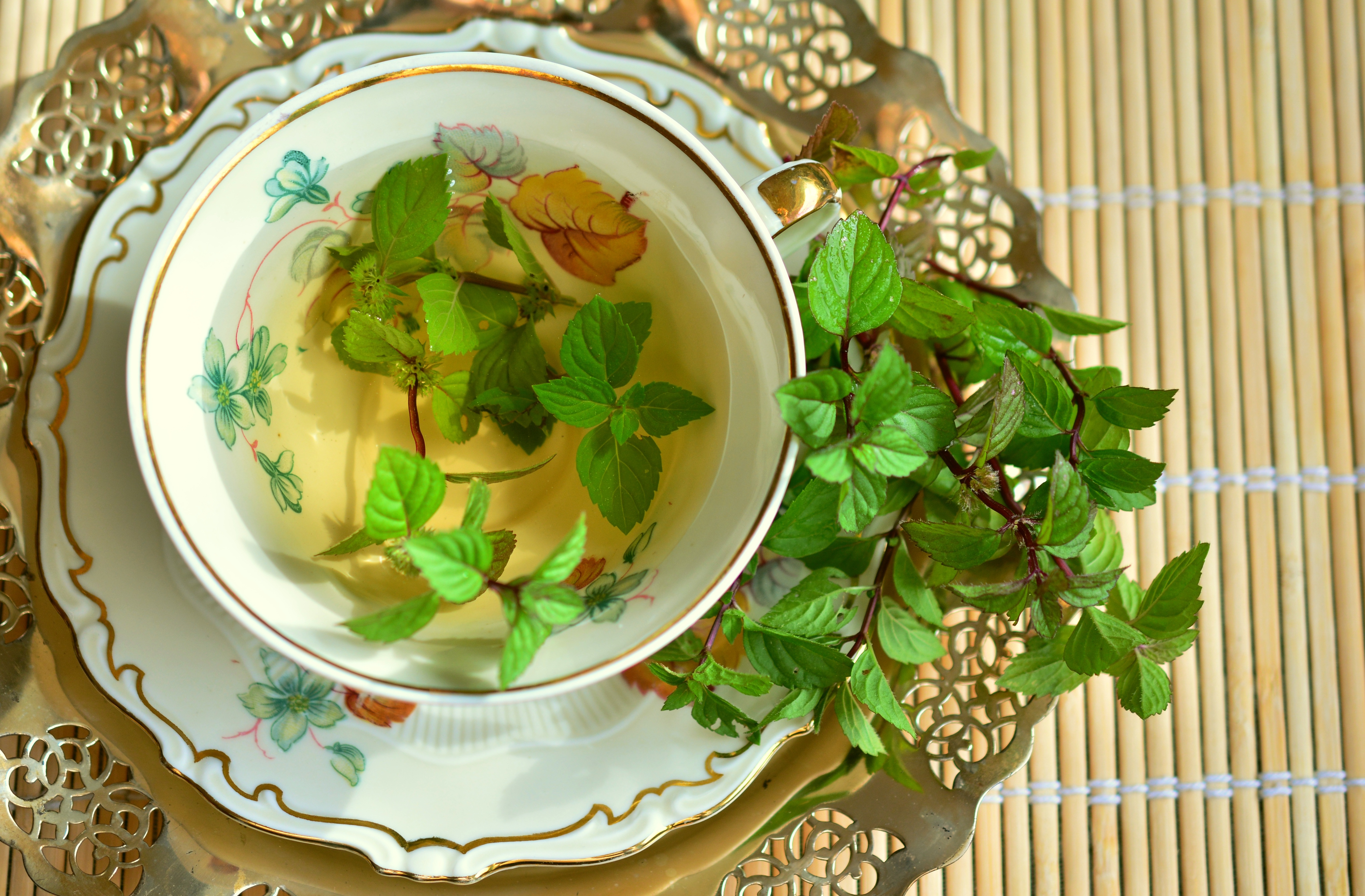
- Type: Herbal tea
- Other names: Peppermint tea; spearmint tea; bakha-cha
- Origin: Various
- Quick description: Tea made from mint leaves
- Temperature: 195 °F (91 °C)
- Time: 3 minutes

Korean name
- Hangul: 박하차
- Hanja: 薄荷茶
- RR: bakhacha
- MR: pakhach'a
- IPA: [pa.kʰa.tɕʰa]

Mint tea is a herbal tea made by infusing mint leaves in hot water. Mint tea can be brewed with fresh leaves, or with dehydrated leaves that have been dried to a moisture level of less than 10%. Mint tea made with peppermint leaves is called peppermint tea, and mint tea made with spearmint is called spearmint tea. There also exist teas that infuse peppermint and spearmint leaves. In Korea, traditional mint tea called bakha-cha (박하차) is made with East Asian wild mint leaves. In India, traditional mint tea called pudina chai (पुदीना चाय) is made by steeping spearmint or peppermint in hot chai.

Due to the high content of essential oils in leaves (1–2.5%), especially menthol, mint tea is popular for its curative effects. Affecting the digestive system and excretion of gastric juices, it is thought to act as an anti-inflammatory.

== Brewing ==
While colloquially named “tea,” peppermint tea is actually an infusion, or tisane. True teas (such as black, green, oolong, and white tea) are all derived from the Camellia sinensis plant, while tisanes are made from the flowers, leaves, roots, seeds, bark, or berries of a variety of different plants. Like true teas, mint tea may be consumed hot or cold, and served with milk or sweeteners such as sugar or honey.

True teas contain caffeine and tannins, compounds that can produce a bitter taste. The levels of these compounds in a cup of tea can vary based on steeping time and water temperature. To achieve a pleasant drinking experience, true teas are prepared using specific brewing times and temperature ranges.

Mint tea, as a tisane, does not contain these compounds at similarly high concentrations, making it less prone to bitterness from oversteeping, allowing for a wider range of steeping times and temperatures.

=== Brewing fresh leaves ===
To prepare mint tea from fresh leaves, the leaves are harvested, washed, and placed in boiling water for a few minutes. While fresh and dried leaves have similar flavors, some studies suggest that tea brewed with fresh leaves produces a fresher, more aromatic experience.

=== Brewing dried leaves ===
Dried leaves may be brewed loose or in tea bags. When brewing with tea bags, the most common way to brew tea, most brands recommend one bag per 8oz ounces of water.

Brewing recommendations vary by brand, with suggested steeping times ranging from about 3 to 15 minutes and temperatures generally between 200°F and 212°F.

== Health effects ==
=== Tumor suppression ===
Peppermint has been found to promote anti-tumor activity in laboratory studies by suppressing okadaic acid (OA), a tumor-promoting toxin. It is one of eight plants shown to significantly reduce the effects of OA.

Menthol, the naturally occurring compound found in mint plants, appears to suppress arylamine N-acetyltransferase (NAT) activity in liver tumor cells. NAT activity plays a critical role in tumor survival, growth, and chemotherapy resistance.

Peppermint extract has been shown to exert a toxic effect on cancer cells by increasing the activity of the cell-protecting antioxidant enzymes superoxide dismutase and glutathione peroxidase.

=== Antiviral properties ===
Peppermint has been shown to suppress viruses such as Influenza A, herpes simplex virus (HSV), and Vaccinia virus in laboratory studies. Mint extracts can also limit viral replication in HIV‑1, the most common strain of HIV.

=== Antibacterial properties ===
Mint is both antibacterial and antifungal. Menthol and menthone, key compounds found in the naturally occurring oil of mint leaves, have been shown to inhibit several strains of bacteria, including Staphylococcus aureus (staph), Listeria monocytogenes, Salmonella enteritidis, Streptococcus pneumoniae (associated with pneumonia and meningitis), and Haemophilus influenzae (associated with ear, eye, and sinus infections).

=== Digestive health ===
Peppermint can be used to relieve symptoms of irritable bowel syndrome (IBS). Peppermint oil reduces muscle contraction in the gastrointestinal tract by inhibiting calcium inflow. It may also reduce inflammation, nausea, and discomfort by influencing serotonin and cholinergic receptors.

== Gallery ==
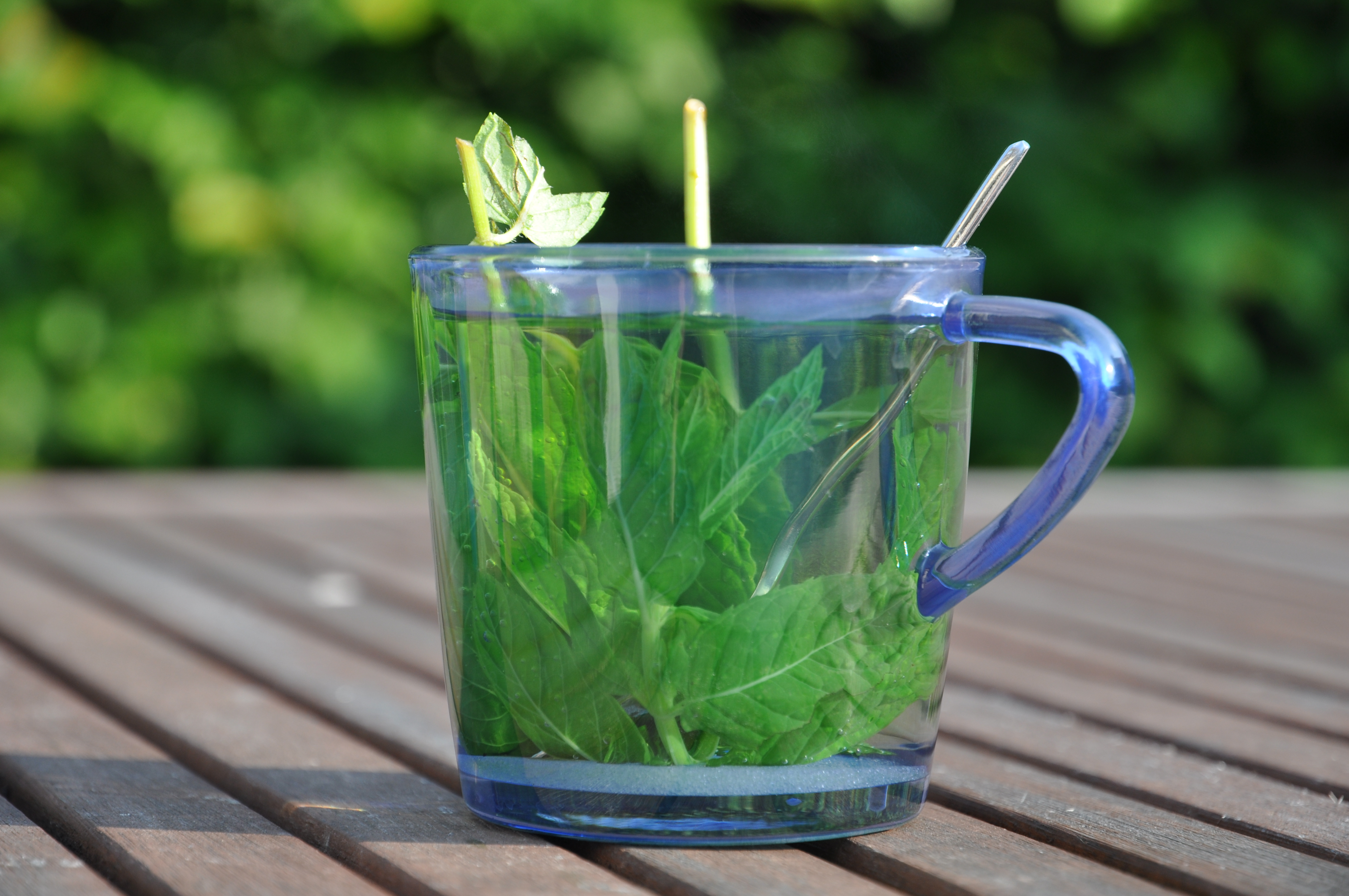
Spearmint tea

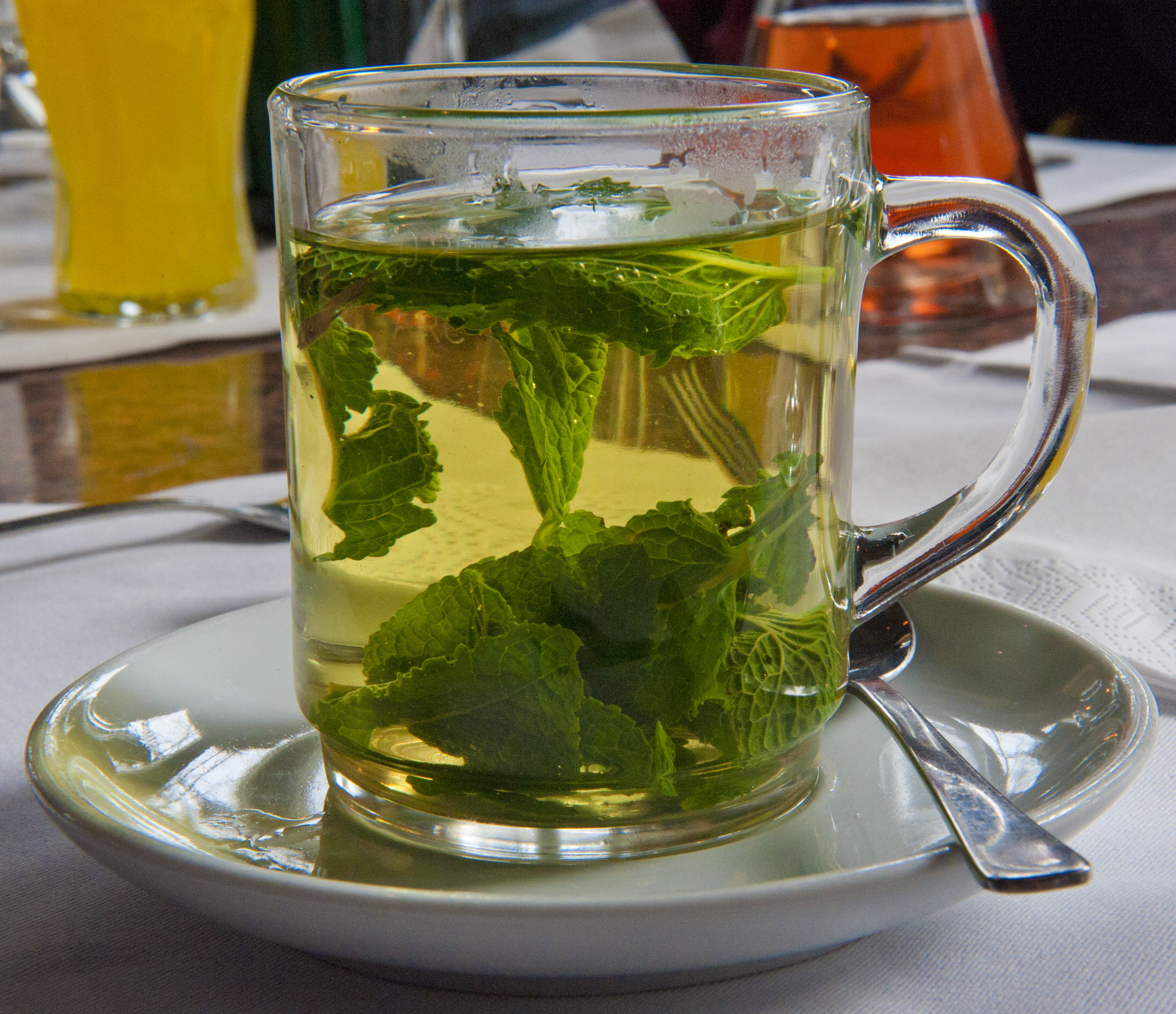
Peppermint tea

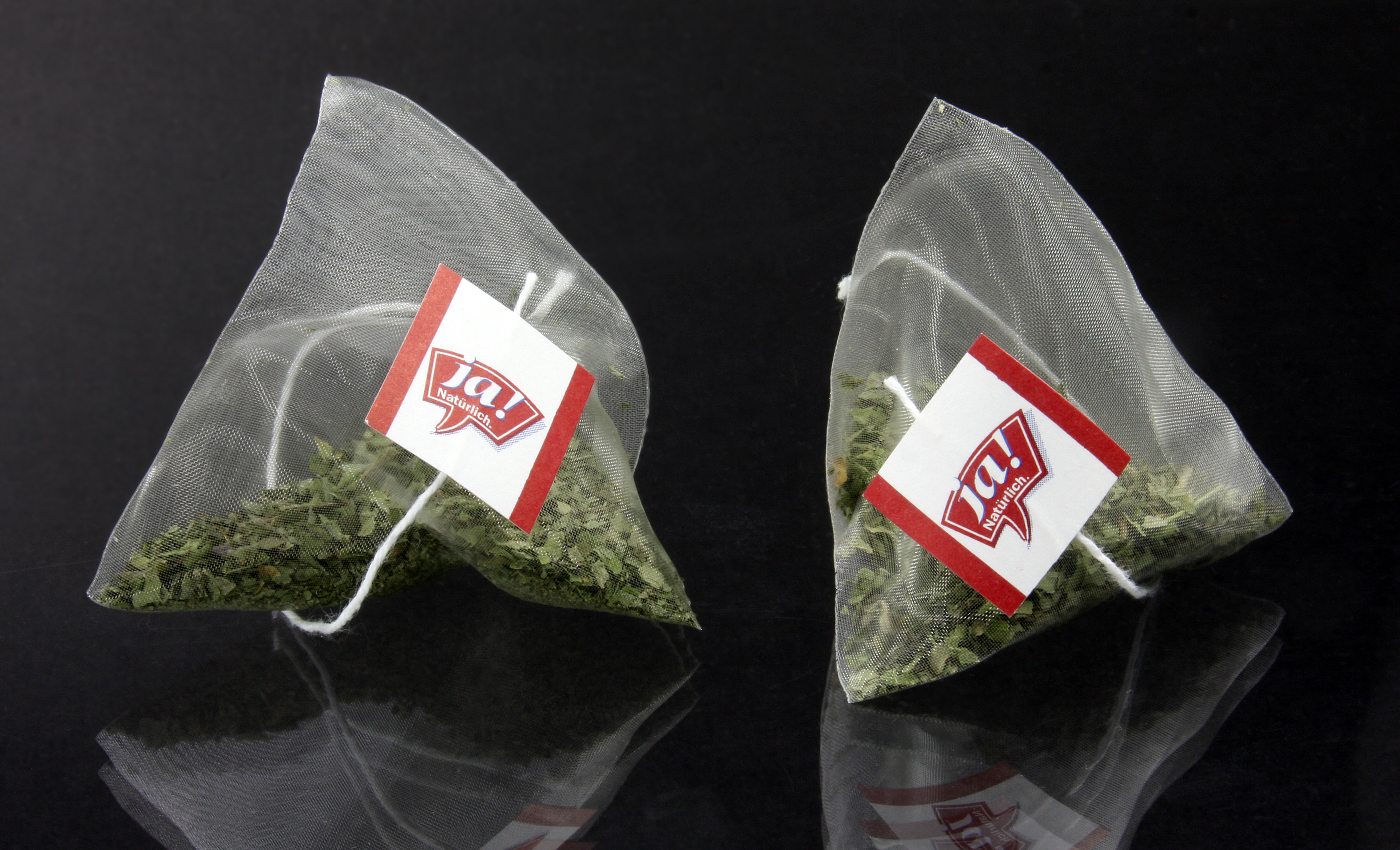
Peppermint tea (tea bag)

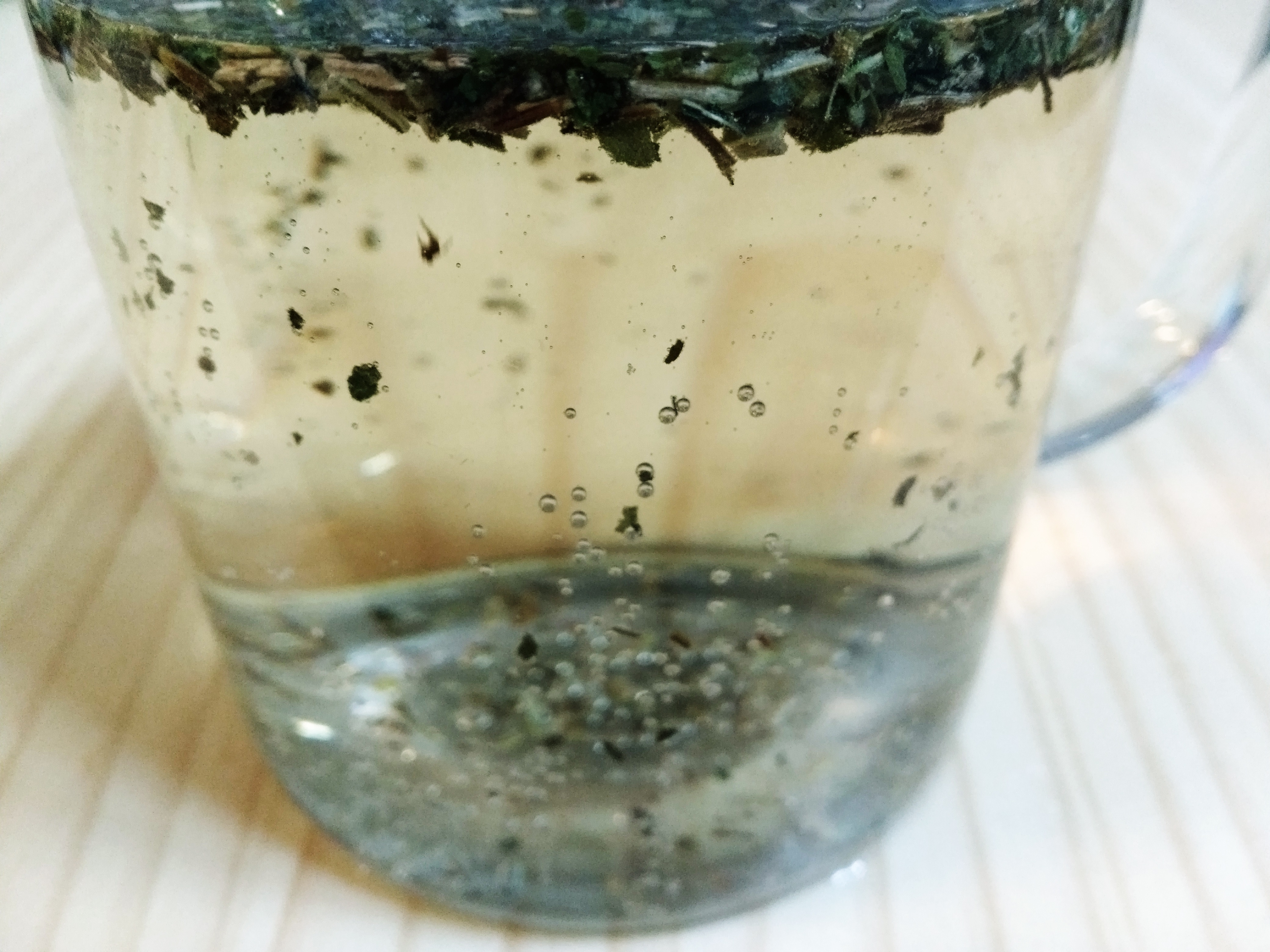
Infusing bakha-cha

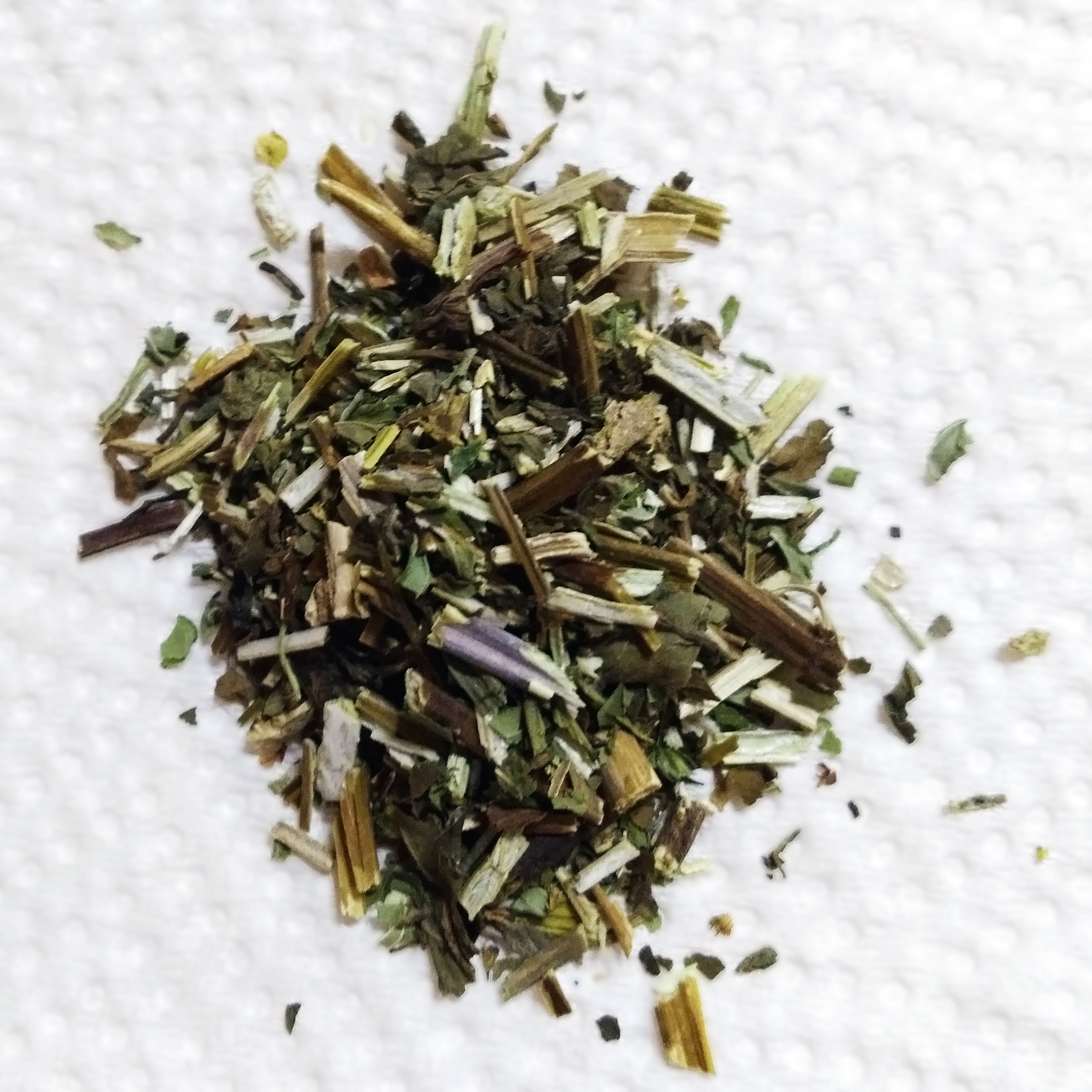
Bakha-cha (dried leaves)

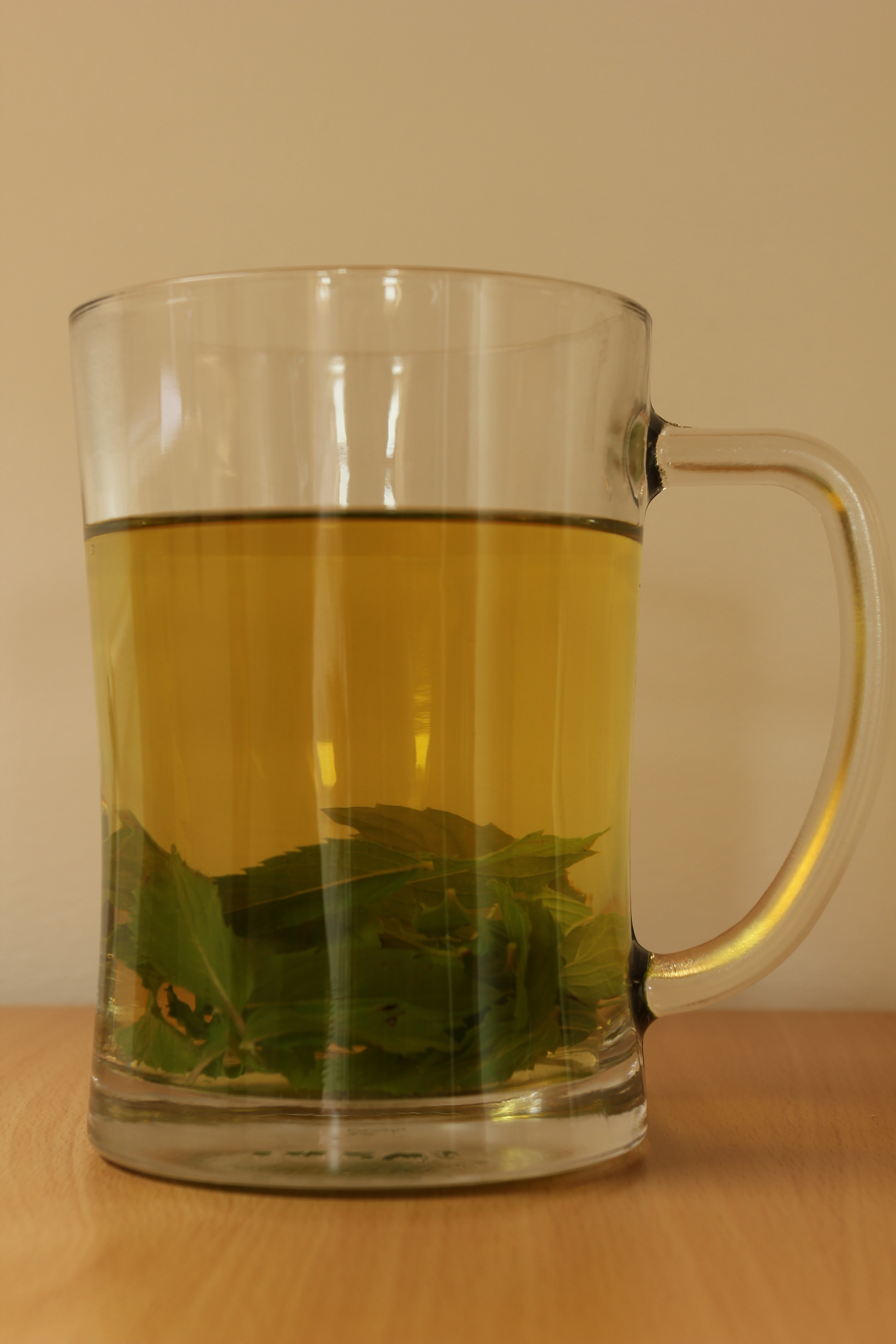
Serving of mint tea

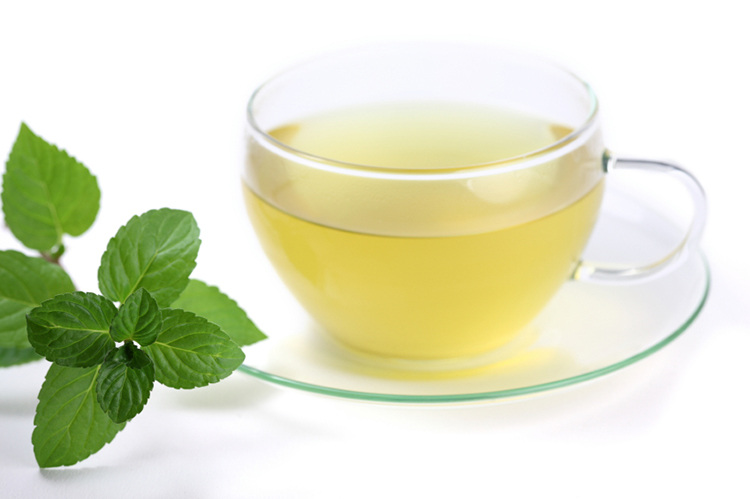
Glass of mint tea beside mint leaves

== See also ==
- Maghrebi mint tea, green tea prepared with mint
