= Caravane cheese =

Brand of camel milk cheese produced in Mauritania

Caravane, also known as Camelbert, is the brand name of a camel milk cheese produced in Mauritania by Tiviski, a company founded by Nancy Abeiderrhamane in 1987. A Brie-like cheese, its availability is largely limited to Mauritania, and as an export to neighboring Senegal.

== Flavor and texture ==
The cheese has similarities to Brie, featuring a bloomy rind and a soft, off-white interior.

== Production ==
Caravane cheese is produced in Mauritania at one of the earliest camel milk dairy plants globally, founded and operated by Nancy Abeiderrahmane. Originally from England and raised in Spain, Abeiderrahmane settled in Mauritania in 1986 after marrying a Mauritanian politician. In 1992, the FAO aided her in creating camel cheese, providing a scientist to teach her a special enzyme method. This resulted in Caravane.

== Global distribution ==
Caravane cheese has faced regulatory hurdles, particularly within the European Union. In 2008, it was reported that the cheese was set to be available in select stores in New York.

The 2016 Oxford Companion to Cheese states that sales of the cheese are mainly limited to Mauritania and Senegal.

== See also ==
- Camel § Dairy
- List of cheeses
