= Mauritanian cuisine =

Culinary traditions of Mauritania

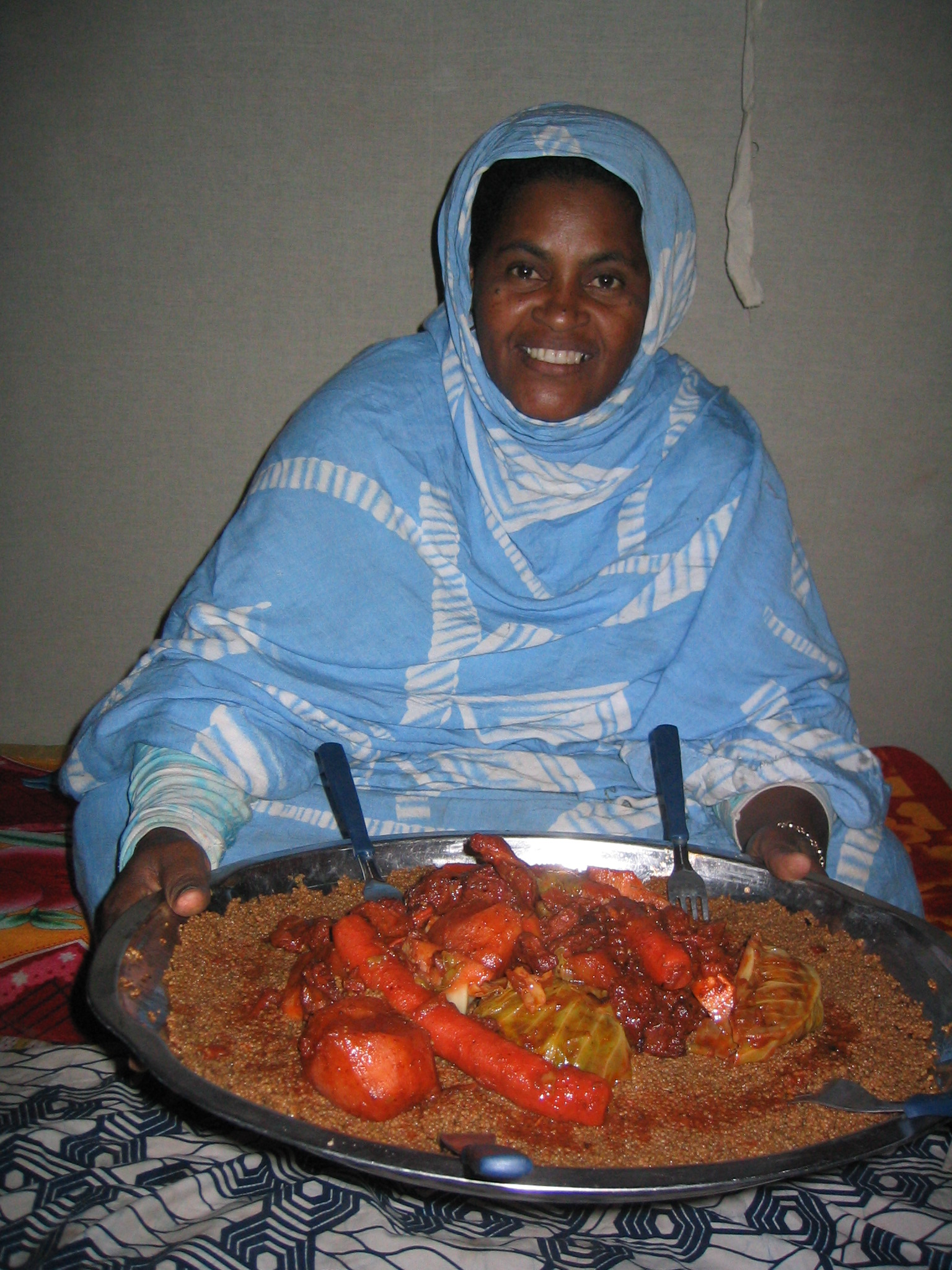
Camel couscous, made under a tent in an area of dunes

Location of Mauritania

The cuisine of Mauritania, including the culinary practices of Mauritania, has been influenced by Arab, Berbers and African peoples who have lived in and traversed the "stark" landscape marked with Sahara desert dunes in caravans. There is an overlap with Moroccan cuisine in the north and Senegalese cuisine in the south.

French colonial influence (Mauritania was a colony until 1960) has also played a role in influencing the cuisine of the relatively isolated land. Alcohol is prohibited in the Muslim faith and its sale is largely limited to hotels. Mint tea is widely consumed and poured from height to create foam. Traditionally, meals are eaten communally.

== Dishes ==
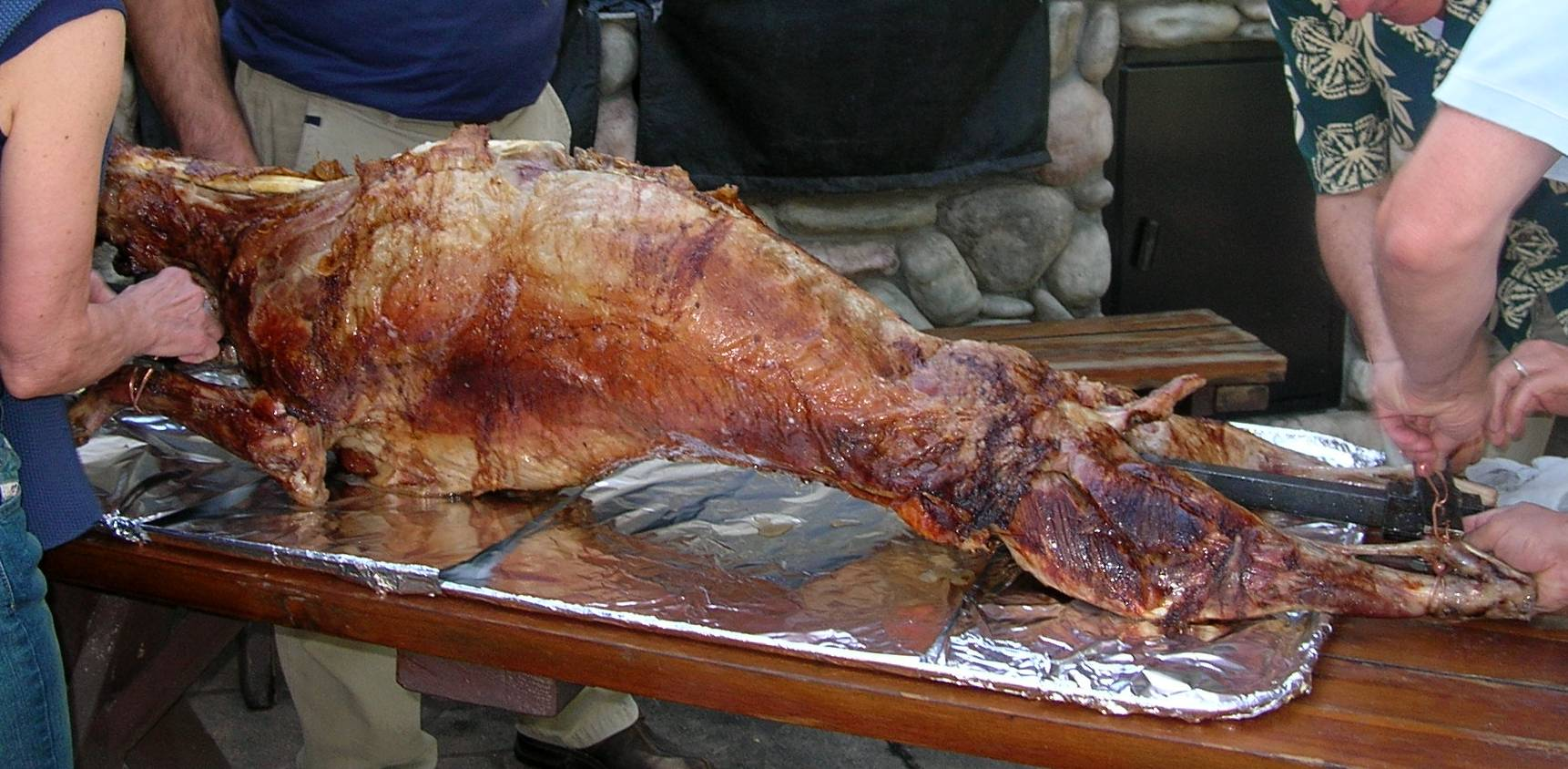
Méchoui

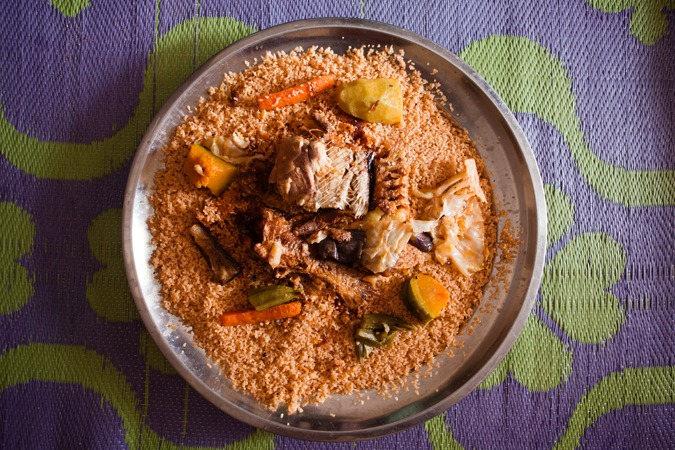
Thieboudienne in Mauritania

Traditional Mauritanian dishes include:

- Thieboudienne (cheb-u-jin), a coastal dish of fish and rice, is considered the national dish of Mauritania, served in a white and red sauce, usually made from tomatoes
- Méchoui, whole roasted lamb
- Samak mutabal (spiced fish)
- 'araz Bialkhadrawat (rice with vegetables)
- Fish balls
- Dried fish
- Dried meat
- Couscous
- Goat stuffed with rice
- Camel (unusual) (made from dromedaries)
- Caravane cheese
- Yassa poulet, chicken rotisserie with vegetables served over French fries or rice, originally a Senegalese dish from the Wolof and Pulaar tribes
- Yassa fish
- Mahfe, goat or camel meat in a peanut, okra and tomato sauce, served over rice and can also be made without meat (for vegetarians)
- Hakko, a sauce made from leafy vegetables served with beans over couscous
- Lakh, cheese curds or yoghurt with grated coconut served over sweet millet porridge
- Marolaym, one-pot dish of lamb or goat meat with rice in an onion base
- Bulgur wheat with dried fruit
- Maru we-llham, meat with rice and vegetables
- Mauritanian terrine
- Camel chubbagin, a stew
- Cherchem, Mauritanian lamb couscous
- Chubbagin lélé et raabie, fish stew
- Fish pastry
- Mauritanian vermicelli
- Harira, soup dish
- Mauritanian pepper steak with coconut
- Banaf, meat and vegetable stew
- Leksour, Mauritanian pancakes with meat and vegetable sauce
- Bonava, a lamb stew
- Al-Aïch, chicken, beans and couscous

=== Beverages ===
- Mint tea
- Zrig, milk or water mixed with fermented milk
- Baobab fruit drink (jus de bouye)
- Roselle drink (bissap)

== See also ==
- Arab cuisine
- Maghrebi cuisine
- List of African cuisines
- Moroccan cuisine
- Senegalese cuisine
