= Camel milk =

Milk produced by female camels

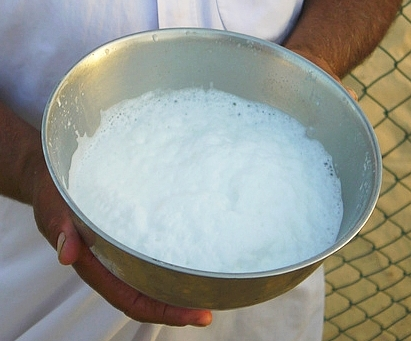
Fresh camel milk

Camel milk is milk from female camels. It has supported nomad and pastoral cultures since the domestication of camels millennia ago. Herders may for periods survive solely on the milk when taking the camels on long distances to graze in desert and arid environments, especially in parts of the Middle East, North Africa and the Horn of Africa. The camel dairy farming industry has grown in Australia and the United States, as an environmentally friendly alternative to cow dairy farming using a species well-adapted to arid regions. Camel milk has different nutritional characteristics from cow milk, but the proportions of nutrients can be highly variable based on a number of factors, including type and age of camel, climate, what it eats, and milking method. It can be used to make products such as yogurt and ice cream, but is not so easily turned into butter or cheese. Camel milk tastes similar to cow's milk.

== History ==
Before the conception and spread of Islam, many Arabs were herdsmen who lived off the milk from their camels and the produce of desert oases.

Today, desert nomad tribes use camel milk, which can be readily made into yogurt, as a staple food, and can live for up to a month on nothing but camel milk.

== Production ==
Camel milk production (whole, fresh) – 2017
Country	tonnes
Somalia	953,673
Kenya	876,224
Mali	300,000
Ethiopia	171,706
Saudi Arabia	134,266
Niger	107,745
World	2,852,213
Source: FAOSTAT of the United Nations

In 2017, world production of whole, fresh camel milk was 2.85 million tonnes, led by Somalia and Kenya with 64% of the global total (table). Mali and Ethiopia were other significant producers.

=== Australia ===
After being introduced to Australia in the 1840s to assist with exploration and trade in the harsh interior before being overtaken by modern communications and transport methods, the feral camel population has grown to in excess of 600,000. Australia's first camel dairies opened in 2014, and the number has been growing ever since, with demand growing both locally and internationally. In 2016 the Australian government reported in 2016 that "the five years to 2021 are expected to see a major increase in Australian camel milk production". Production has grown from 50,000 litres (11,000 imp gal) of camel milk in 2016 to 180,000 litres (40,000 imp gal) per annum in 2019. One farm has grown from three wild camels in 2014 to over 300 in 2019, and exports mostly to Singapore, with shipments of both fresh and powdered product set to start to Thailand and Malaysia.

One litre of pasteurised camel milk retailed for about A$15 (US$10; £8) in Australia in 2019, which was about 12 times more expensive than cow's milk. As of April 2020, Australia has seven camel dairies, which produce meat and skincare products in addition to milk and cheese. There was one certified organic commercial camel milk dairy in 2019.

=== United States ===
As of 2014 the United States had an imported population of 5,000 camels. The cost of producing camel's milk is considerably higher than that of producing cow's milk. In the United States, female camels are very rare; they mature slowly and can be bred safely only after age four. Their thirteen-month gestation period must conclude in a live birth followed by suckling, else the female camel will stop producing milk. Unlike a dairy cow which is parted from her calf when it is born and then gives milk for six to nine months, a camel can share her milk with the farmer and her calf for 12–18 months.

== Milk yields and nutritional value ==
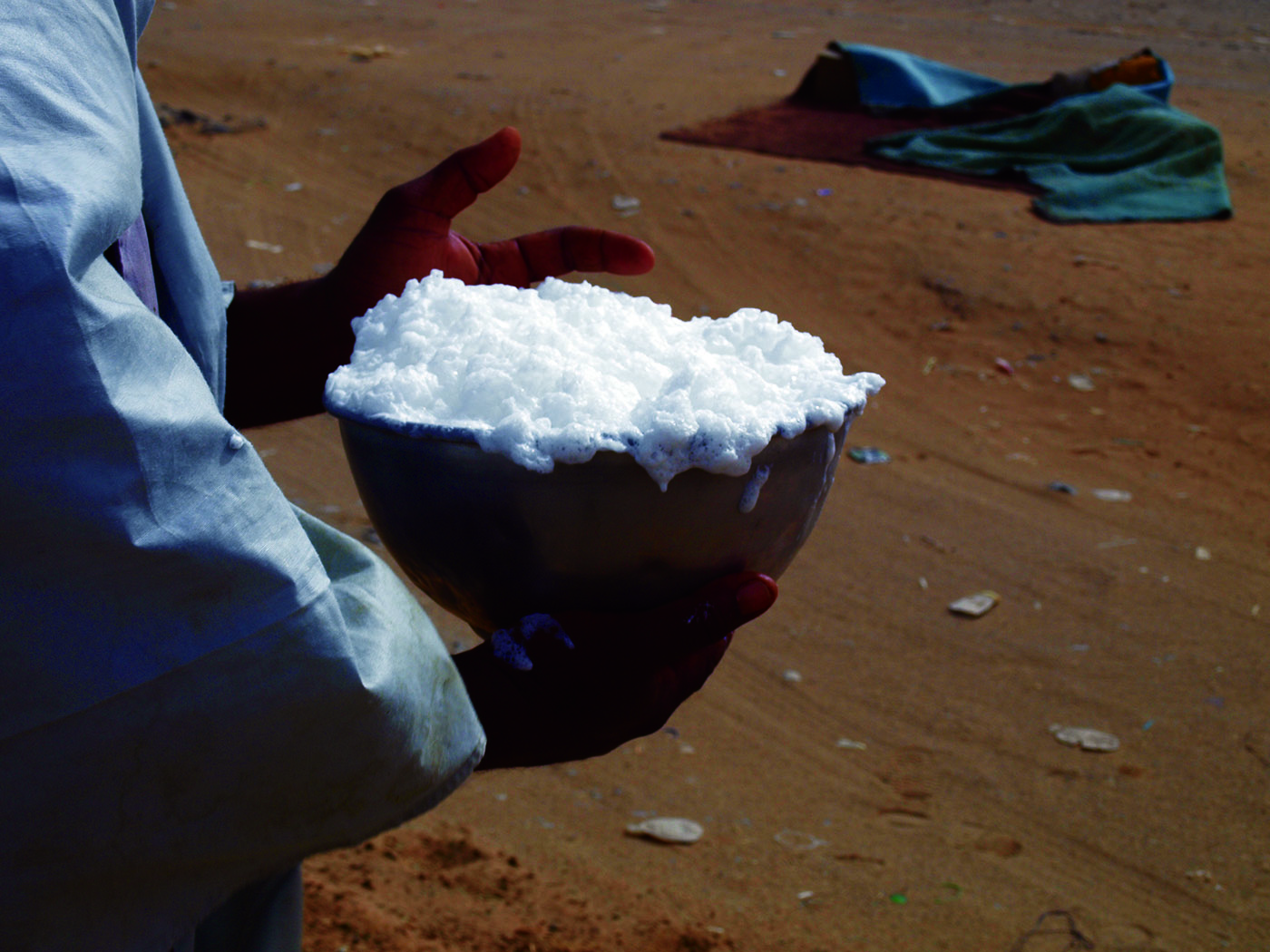
Camel milk curds

Both milk yields and the nutritional composition of camel milk are affected by many factors, including "forage quantity and quality, watering frequency, climate, breeding age, parity, milking frequency, calf nursing, milking method (hand or machine milking), health, and reproductive status".

=== Yields ===
Pakistani and Afghan camels are supposed to produce the highest yields of milk, up to 30 litres per day. The Bactrian camel produces 5 litres per day and the dromedary produces an average of 20 litres per day. Intensive breeding of camels has created animals that can produce up to 40 litres per day in ideal conditions. Camels, with their ability to go 21 days without drinking water, and produce milk even when feeding on low-quality fodder, are a sustainable option for food security in difficult environments.

=== Nutritional value ===
According to the United States Food and Drug Administration (FDA), camel milk contains 3% fat. However, it is reported in the literature that the proportion of fat in the milk varies from country to country and region to region, and is also dependent upon diet, level of hydration of the animal, and type of camel. In a detailed report published by the Food and Agriculture Organization of the United Nations in 1982, a table shows fat content varying from as low as 1.1% (in arid areas of Israel) to 5.5% (Ethiopia). A 2015 systematic review reports the fat content of dromedary milk as between 1.2% and 6.4%.

Camel farmers may provide a degree of control over factors affecting the nutritional content of the milk produced by their camels. Producers of camel milk in Australia state that their products have lower fat and lactose than cow's milk.

== Camel milk products ==
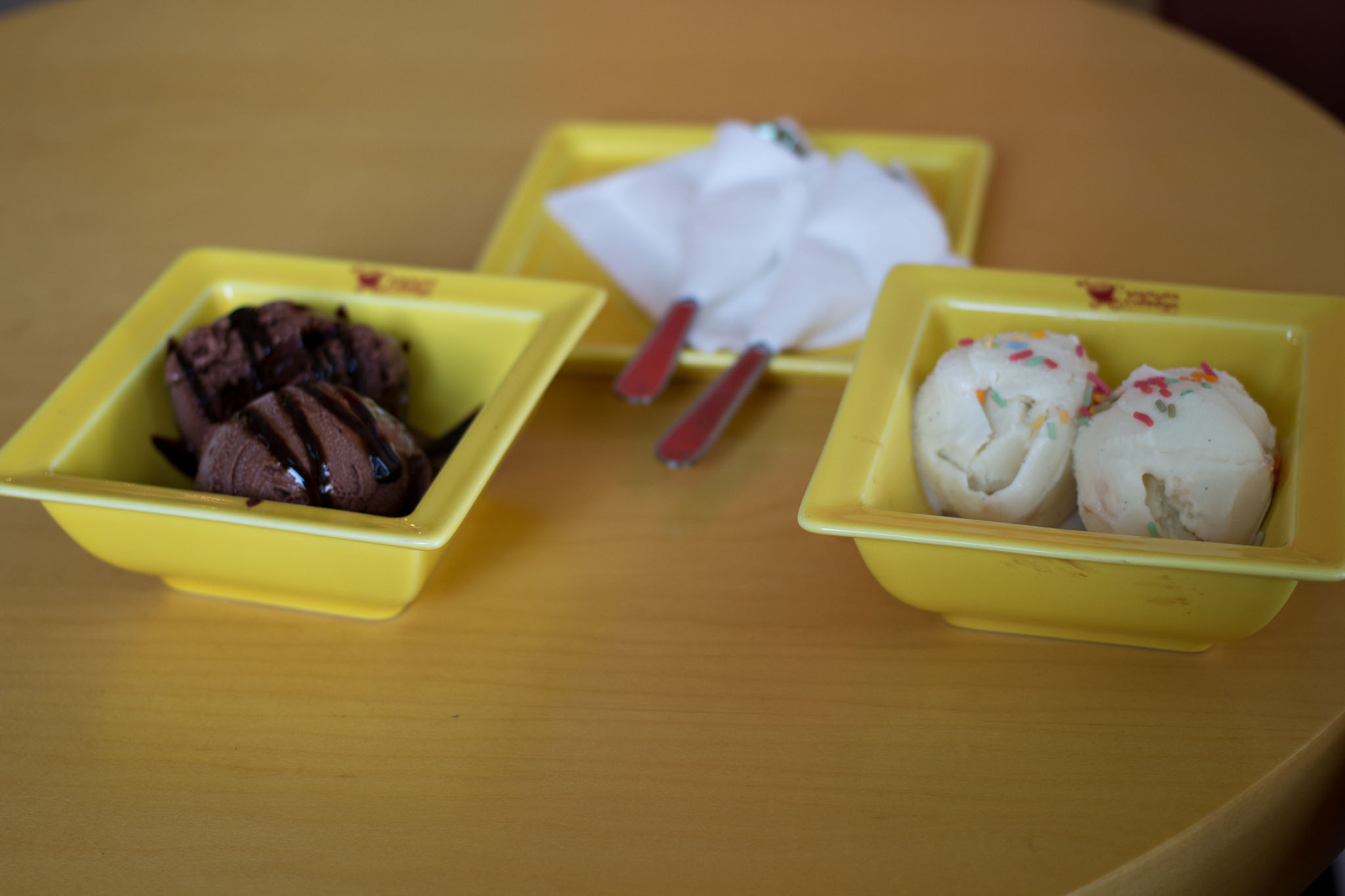
Camel milk ice cream

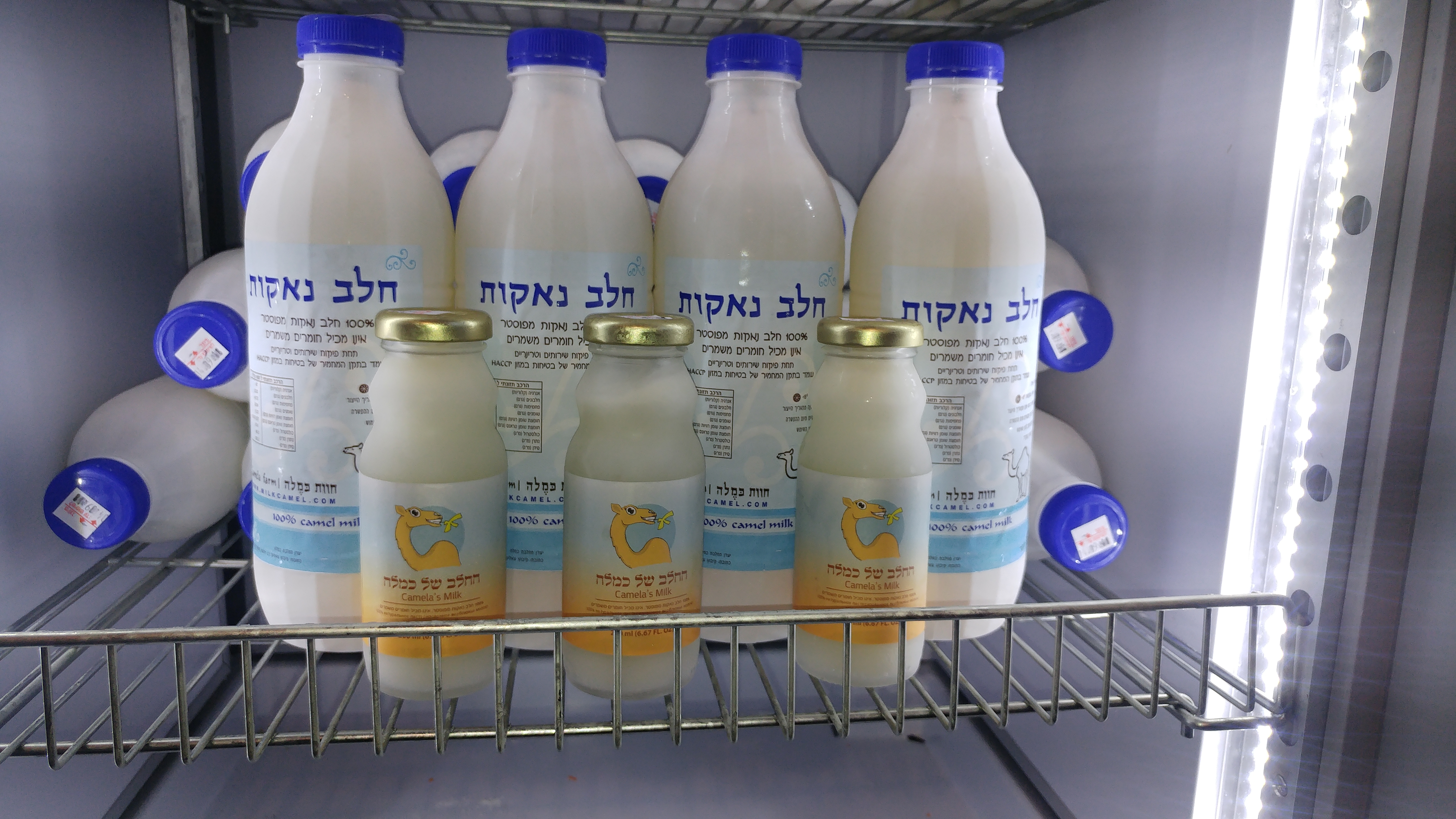
Camel milk sold in plastic bottles in Israel

Camel milk can readily be made into yogurt, but can only be made into butter if it is soured first, churned, and a clarifying agent is then added. As a beverage, camel milk tastes similar to cow's milk, but slightly saltier.

Cheese from camel milk is more difficult to make than cheese from the milk of other dairy animals. In camel-herding communities, camel milk cheeses use spontaneous fermentation or lactic fermentation to achieve a sour curd; in camel farming in Sudan, the Rashaida tribe use this method to store surplus milk in the rainy season, pulverising the dried curds and adding water for consumption in the dry season, and in Mongolia, camel milk is consumed as a product at various stages of the curd-making process. However, the milk does not coagulate easily and bovine rennet fails to coagulate the milk effectively. Developing less wasteful uses of the milk, the FAO commissioned Professor J.P. Ramet of the École Nationale Supérieure d'Agronomie et des Industries Alimentaires (ENSAIA), who was able to produce curdling by the addition of calcium phosphate and vegetable rennet in the 1990s. The cheese produced from this process has low levels of cholesterol and is easy to digest, even for the lactose intolerant. The European-style cheese, marketed under the name Caravane, was created through collaboration between Mauritanian camel milk dairy Tiviski, the FAO, and Ramet. It is claimed to be the only camel milk cheese in the world.

Camel milk can also be made into ice cream.

Fermented camel milk products include chal or shubat in Central Asia and Iran, khoormog in Mongolia, garris in Sudan, suusac in Kenya and Somalia, leben (lben) in Arab countries, and ititu and dhanaan in Ethiopia. Other traditional fermented beverages based on a mixture of camel milk and water are available in Mauritania known as zrig, in Morocco known as lfrik.
