= Western Saharan cuisine =

Cuisine of Western Sahara

Location of Western Sahara

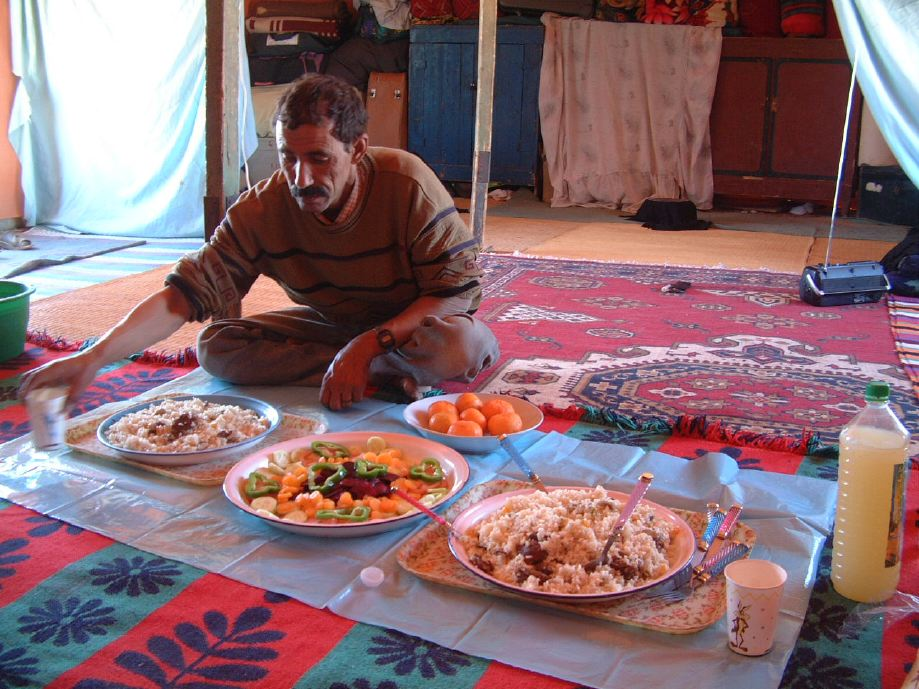
Saharawi cuisine

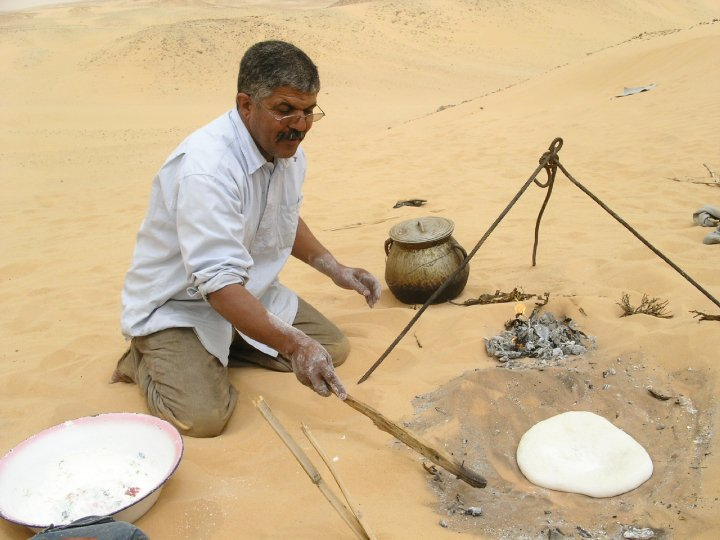
Saharawi bread

Western Saharan cuisine comprises the cuisine of Western Sahara, a disputed territory in the Maghreb region of North Africa, bordered by Morocco to the north, Algeria to the extreme northeast, Mauritania to the east and south, and the Atlantic Ocean to the west. The Western Saharan cuisine has several influences, as the population of that area, Sahrawis, are for the most part of Arabic and Berber origin. Saharawi cuisine is also influenced by Spanish cuisine owing to Spanish colonization.

Food is primarily imported into Western Sahara, as minimal rainfall in the territory inhibits agricultural production. Indigenous sources of food include those derived from fishing and nomadic pastoralism. The labor and business in these indigenous provisions of foods are also a primary contributor of income for the territory's population, and are among the primary contributors to the economy of Western Sahara.

A main staple food is the couscous that often accompanies one way or another all the food dishes. The influence of southern cuisine makes peanuts an accompaniment of some dishes.

For meat, the Sahrawis favor camel and goat; lamb is also prominent. Some tribes are famous for growing wheat, barley and cereals in general.

Some fruits and vegetables are grown in oases that are scattered within the territory.

== Common foods and dishes ==
Being almost entirely nomadic, Saharan tribes based their diet on meat, milk and dairy derivatives. Coastal tribes added fish dishes and rice.

- Couscous with meat and vegetables.
- Tajín, camel meat, made solely from dromedaries.
- Goat meat.
- Mreifisa, a traditional dish of the region, is a stew prepared with rabbit, lamb or camel meat, onion, and garlic, served atop unleavened bread cooked in the sand.
- Ezzmit, cereals.
- El aych, cereals with milk.
- Arroz con pescado.
- Various types of roasts.

== Beverages ==
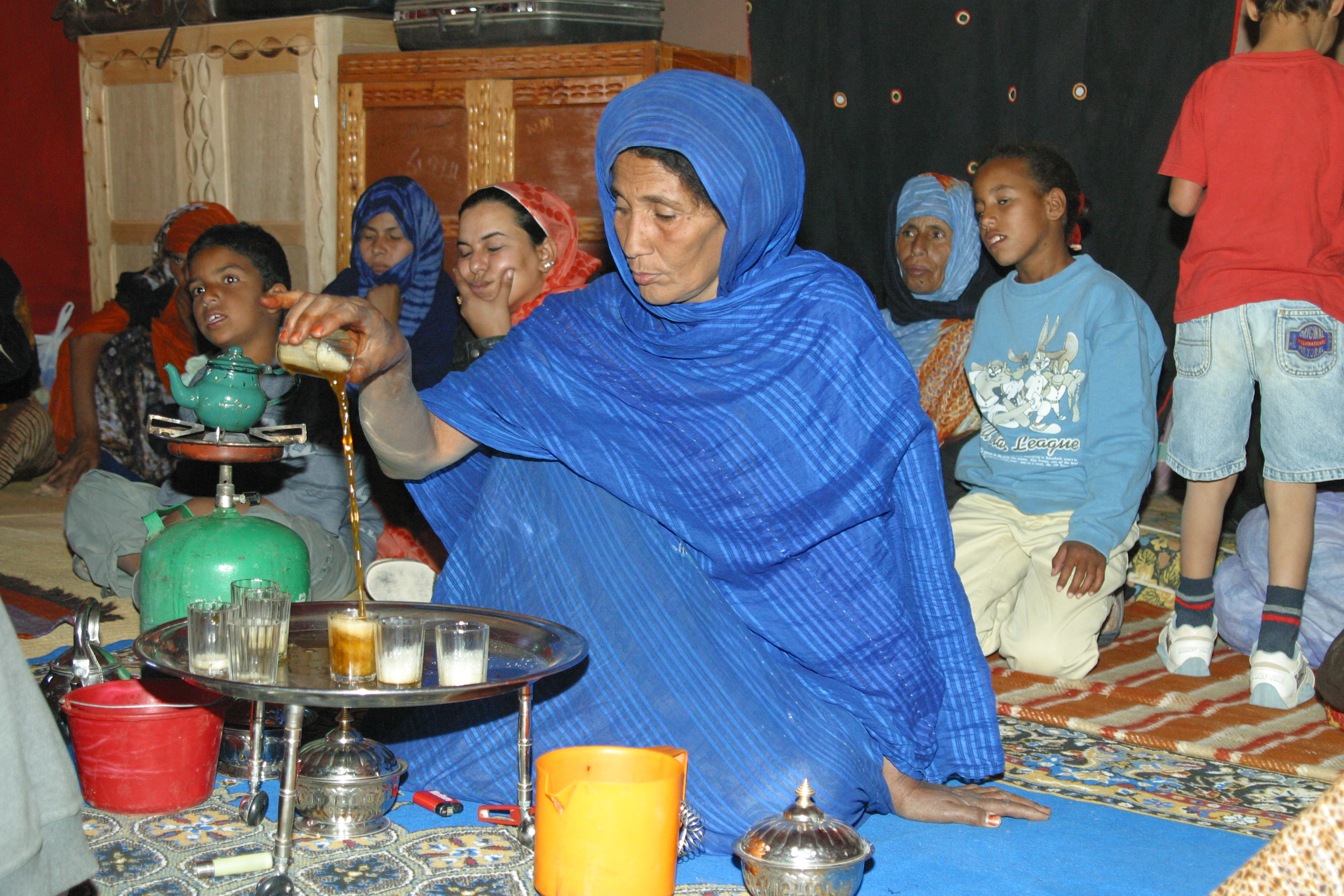
Saharawi tea

- Tea has a social and familial purpose for Saharawi people. It usually follows a ritual, in which are taken three vessels. In this regard, there is a popular comment: "The first glass of tea is bitter like life, the second cup sweet like love and the third soft as death."
- Camel milk, milked solely from dromedaries.
- Goat milk.

== See also ==
- Mauritanian cuisine
- Moroccan cuisine
