= Maghrebi mint tea =

North African green tea

Mint Tea
- Alternative names: Atay, Atay b'naanaa, Shay-b'naanaa, Latay.
- Place of origin: Morocco
- Region or state: North Africa
- Associated cuisine: Algerian; Libyan; Malian; Mauritanian; Moroccan; Nigerien; Tunisian; Western Saharan
- Serving temperature: Hot

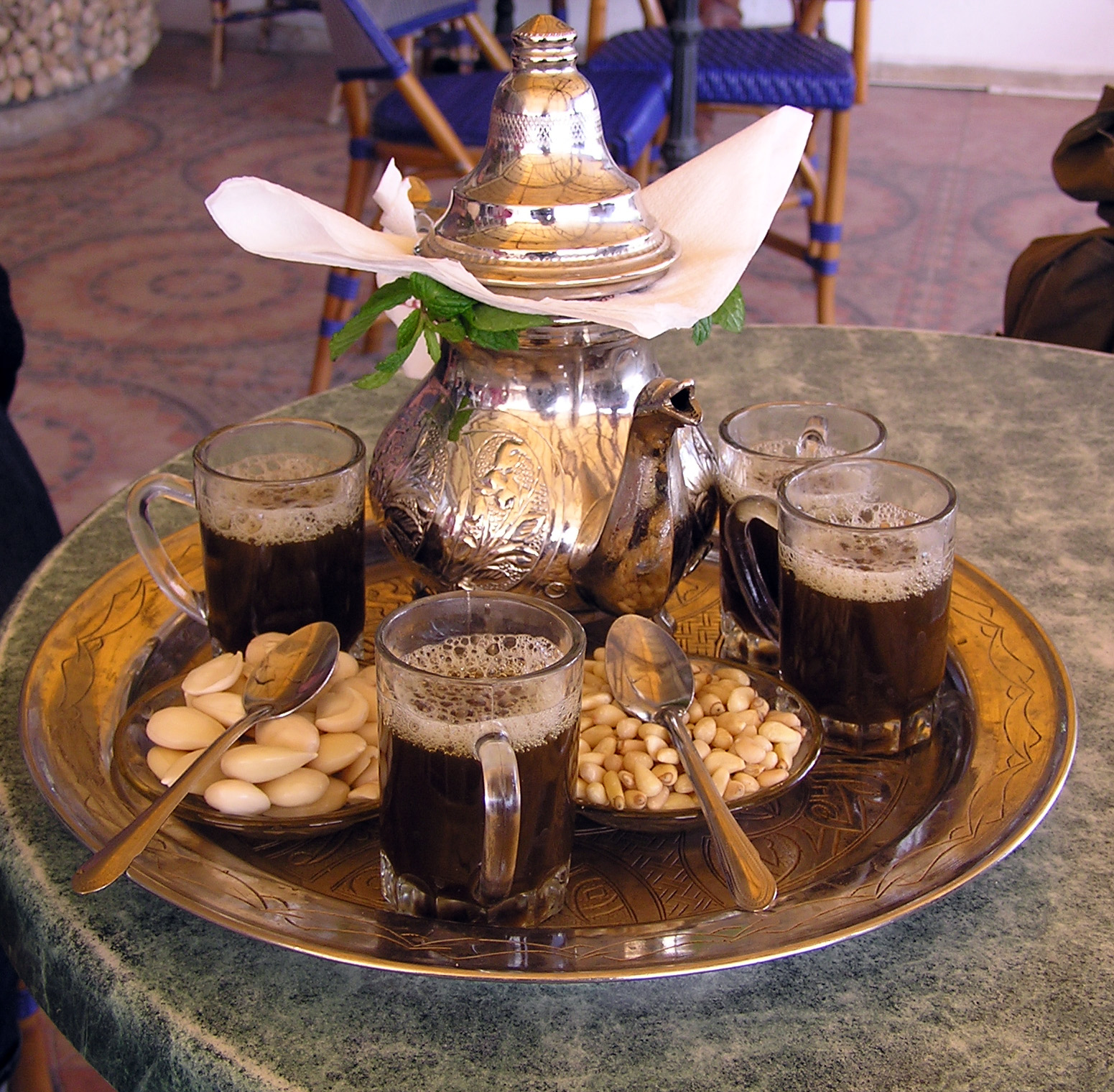
Tunisian mint tea served with nuts

Maghrebi mint tea (Maghrebi Arabic: أتاي, ʾatāy; Arabic: الشاي بالنعناع, romanized: aš-šāy bin-naʿnāʿ), also known as Tunisian mint tea, Algerian mint tea, or Moroccan mint tea is a North African preparation of gunpowder green tea with spearmint leaves and sugar.

It is traditional to the Greater Maghreb region (the northwest African countries of Algeria, Tunisia, Morocco, Libya, and Mauritania). Its consumption has spread throughout North Africa, parts of the Sahel, France, Spain, the Arab world, and Middle East.

Mint tea is central to social life in the Maghreb and is very popular among the Tuareg people of Algeria, Libya, Niger and Mali. The serving can take a ceremonial form, especially when prepared for a guest. The tea is traditionally made by the head male in the family and offered to guests as a sign of hospitality. Typically, at least three glasses of tea are served. The tea is consumed throughout the day as a social activity. The native spearmint naʿnāʿ (نعناع) possesses a clear, pungent, mild aroma, and is the mint that is traditionally used in Maghrebi mint tea. Other hybrids and cultivars of spearmint, including yerba buena, are occasionally used as substitutes for nana mint. In Morocco, mint tea is sometimes perfumed with herbs, flowers, or orange blossom water. In the cold season, they add many warming herbs like marjoram, sage, verbena, and wormwood. Mint has been used as an infusion, decoction, and herbal medicine throughout the Mediterranean since antiquity.

== Name ==
In Mauritania, Morocco and Algeria, the word for tea is tay, atay or lātāy; while in Tunisia it's et-tey. These diverge from the typical Arabic word for tea, shai (شاي). According to Van Driem, ʾit-tāī originates from the Dutch language thee.

== History ==
Gunpowder tea was introduced into North Africa by the British in the 18th and 19th centuries via Morocco and Algeria.

According to food historian Helen Saberi, the drinking of green tea infused with mint spread from Morocco to Algeria, Tunisia, Libya, Egypt and to nomadic tribes of Berbers and Tuareg in the Sahara.

Sugar and tea would arrive from Europe to the port of Essaouira, where Jewish merchants who had started migrating to coastal cities in the 19th century managed their passing through the interior of Morocco. James Richardson recorded a description of a Moroccan tea ceremony in the 1840s, and said that during his travels tea was drunk widely and all day long.

Tea consumption became associated with power and prestige in Morocco, and Ahmed Bin Mubarek, officer of Sultan Suleiman (r. 1792–1822), became the first mūl atay (مول أتاي "master of tea") in the Makhzen. In the twenty years after the Anglo-Moroccan Treaty of 1856, and after the British East India Company diverted tea meant for the Baltic states to Morocco during the Crimean War, tea imports quadrupled but tea consumption remained an urban practice. Among urban populations, partaking in the tea ceremony became a symbol of status and savoir faire, while among rural farmers it was a way to emulate the urban class they both envied and resented. Tea consumption spread through wider segments of the population as a result of the famines of the 1880s, when it became an emergency calorie substitute, appetite suppressant, and mode of performing acculturation for rural populations flooding the cities in search of opportunities.

Another factor in the spread of atay consumption in Morocco was the comparative scarcity of coffee. Whereas Algerian cities had been introduced to coffee culture under the influence of the Ottomans, Moroccan cities would only be introduced to coffee later. Oral traditions in the Algerian city of Tlemcen distinguish between "Fassi tea drinkers and Tlemceni coffee drinkers".

In the late 19th century, Sufi orders led by figures such as Muhammad Bin Abdul-Kabir Al-Kattani told their adherents not to drink tea, attempting to boycott sugar and tea imported by Europeans.

By the early 20th century, mint tea had become well established in Morocco.

== Preparation ==
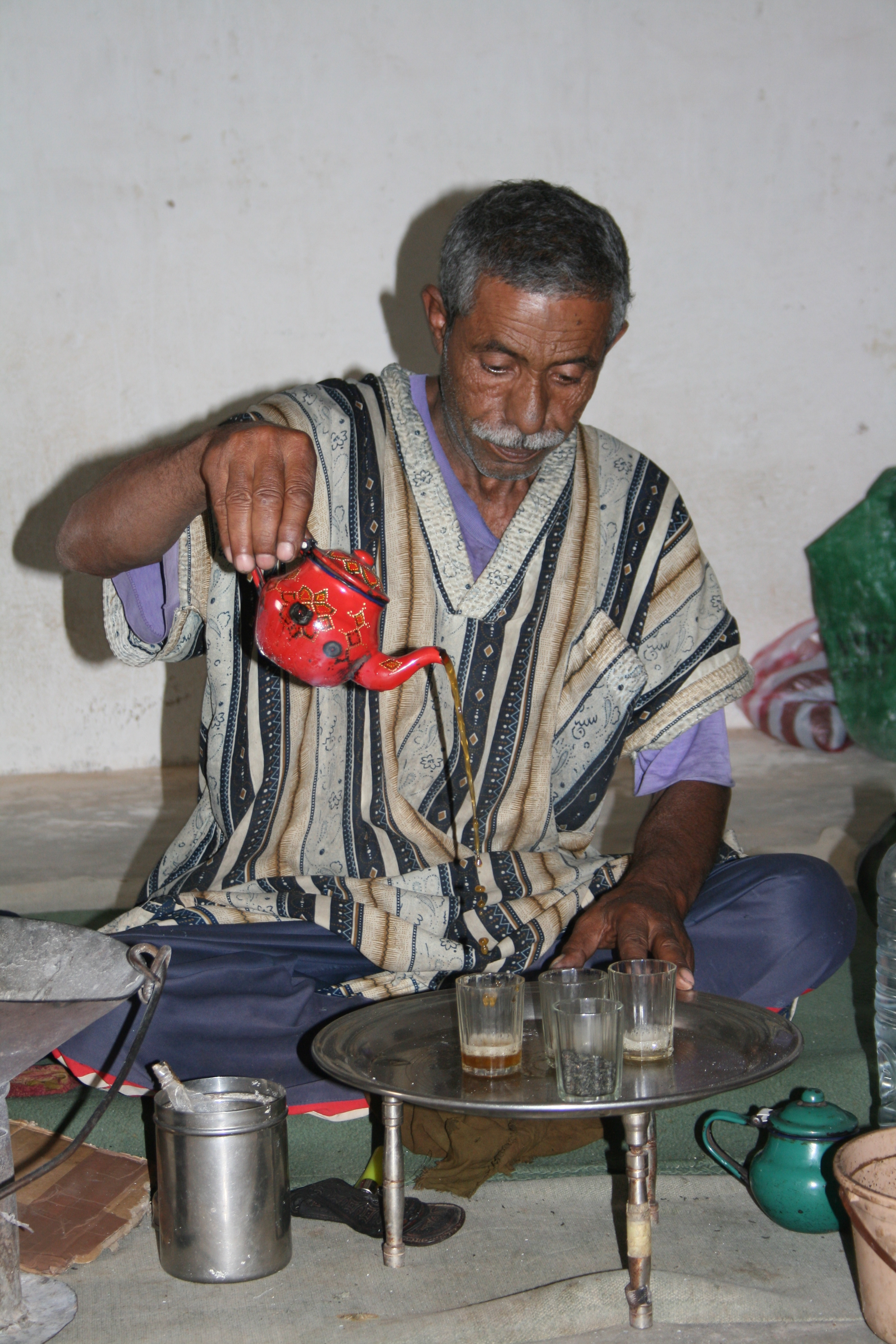
Saharawi tea ceremony

The basic ingredients of the tea are green tea, fresh mint leaves, sugar, and boiling water. The proportions of the ingredients and the brewing time can vary widely. Boiling water is used in the Maghreb, rather than the cooler water that is used in East Asia to avoid bitterness. The leaves are left in the pot while the tea is consumed, changing the flavor from one glass to the next. It is poured into glasses from high above to swirl loose tea leaves to the bottom of the glass, whilst gently aerating the tea to improve its flavor.

In the winter, if mint is rare, sometimes leaves of tree wormwood (الشيبة shība in Moroccan Arabic) are substituted for (or used to complement) the mint, giving the tea a distinctly bitter flavor. Lemon verbena (لويزة lwiza in Moroccan Arabic) is also used to give it a lemon flavor. Other herbs used to flavor the tea include oregano, sage, and thyme. The tea is sometimes sold as a ready-to-cook mixture of tea and dried mint, which is easier to store and to prepare but has diminished flavor.

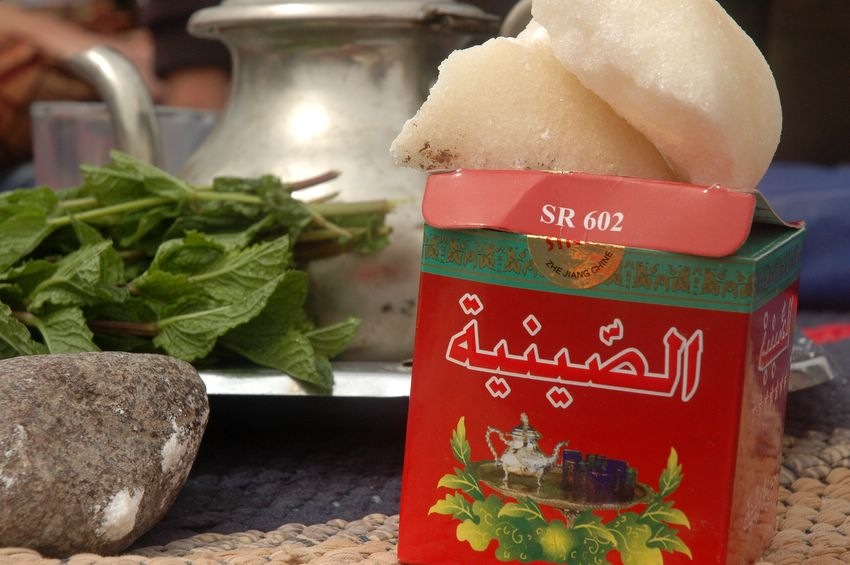
Ingredients

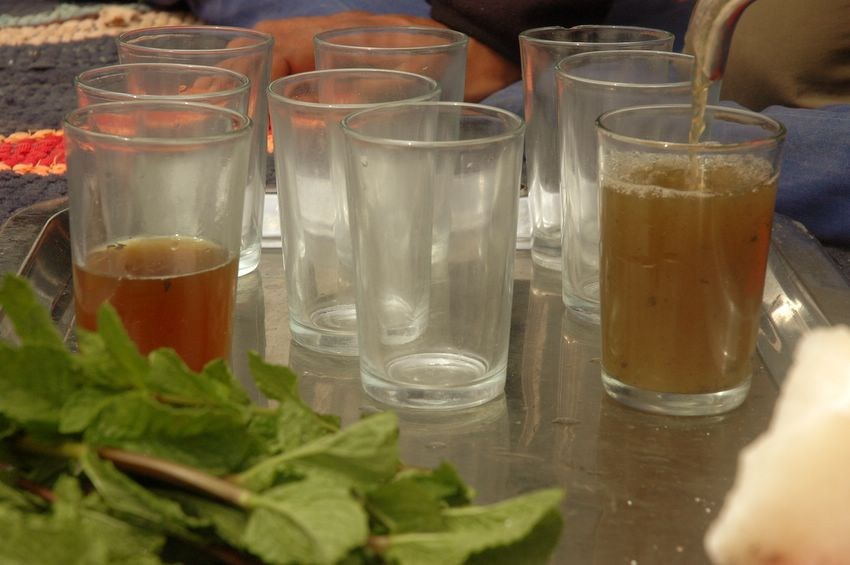
Cleaning the tea

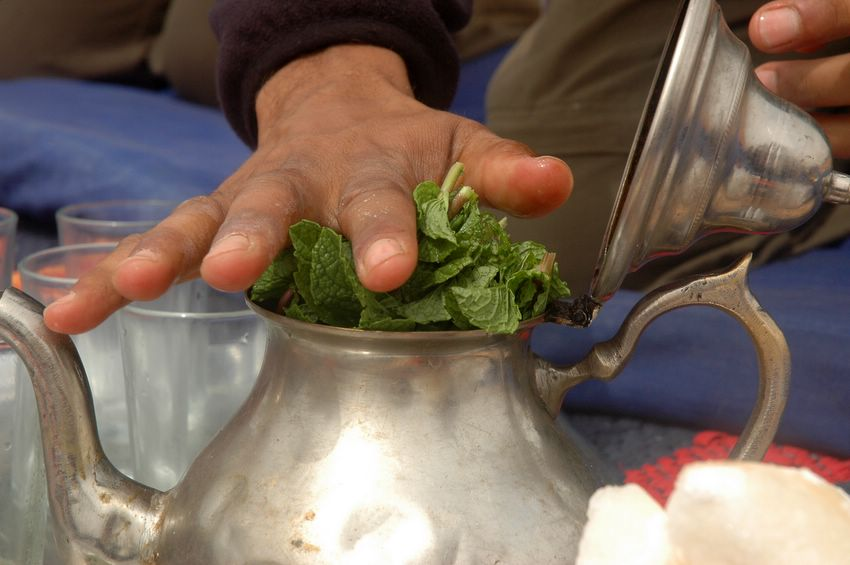
Adding the mint

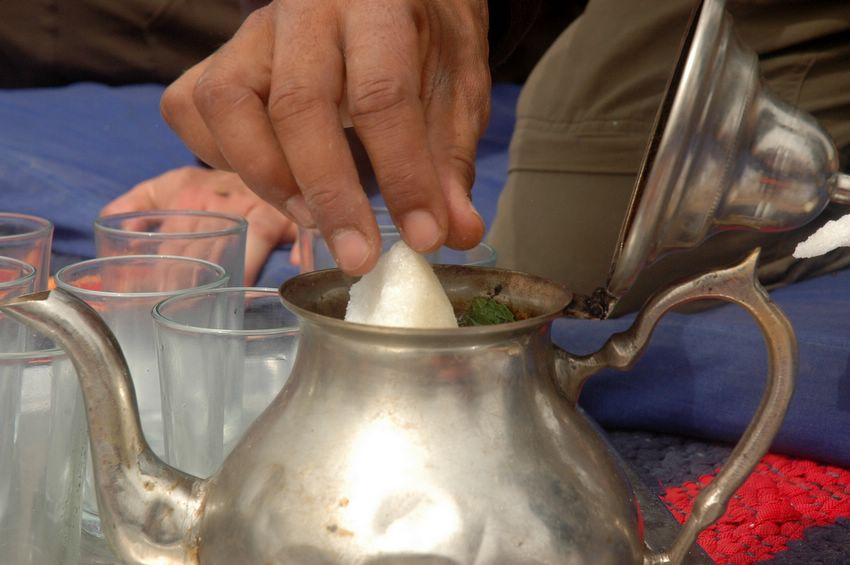
Adding the sugar

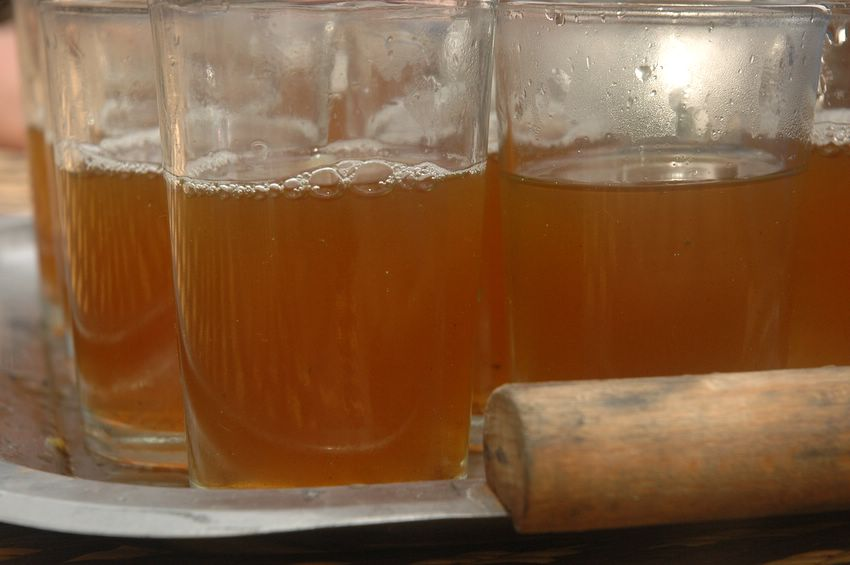
Ready to drink

== Culture ==
Traditionally, the tea is served three times. The amount of time it has been steeping gives each of the glasses of tea a unique flavor, described in this famous Maghrebi proverb:

The first glass is as bitter as life,
the second is as strong as love,
the third is as soothing as death.

In one of Nass El Ghiwane's most popular songs, Es-Siniya (الصينية), the tea tray is used as a metaphor to discuss the hardships of migrating from the countryside to a big city such as Casablanca.

== See also ==
- Arabic tea
- Algerian cuisine
- Tunisian cuisine
- Moroccan cuisine
- Libyan cuisine
- Libyan tea
- Tea culture
