= TRPM5 =

Protein-coding gene in the species Homo sapiens

Identifiers
- Aliases: TRPM5, LTRPC5, MTR1, transient receptor potential cation channel subfamily M member 5
- External IDs: OMIM: 604600; MGI: 1861718; GeneCards: TRPM5

Gene location (Human)
Chr.	Chromosome 11 (human)
Band	11p15.5	Start	2,404,515 bp
Band	11p15.5	End	2,444,514 bp

Gene location (Mouse)
Chr.	Chromosome 7 (mouse)
Band	7|7 F5	Start	142,622,890 bp
Band	7|7 F5	End	142,648,379 bp
RNA expression pattern
Bgee	Human / Mouse (ortholog); Top expressed in: mucosa of transverse colon; seminal vesicula; body of pancreas; duodenum; metanephros; left lobe of thyroid gland; epididymis; right lobe of thyroid gland; caput epididymis; left adrenal cortex / Top expressed in: islet of Langerhans; internal carotid artery; urethra; female urethra; male urethra; efferent ductule; external carotid artery; Gonadal ridge; vas deferens; intestinal villus; More reference expression data
BioGPS	n/a
Gene ontology
Molecular function	voltage-gated ion channel activity; ion channel activity; potassium channel activity; calcium activated cation channel activity; sodium channel activity
Cellular component	plasma membrane; membrane; soma; dendrite; integral component of membrane
Biological process	ion transport; sodium ion transmembrane transport; sensory perception of taste; calcium ion transmembrane transport; potassium ion transmembrane transport; cation transport; regulation of ion transmembrane transport; ion transmembrane transport; transmembrane transport
Sources:Amigo / QuickGO
Orthologs
Databases	NCBI: entry; OMA: entry
Species	Human	Mouse
Entrez	29850	56843
Ensembl	ENSG00000070985	ENSMUSG00000009246
UniProt	Q9NZQ8	Q9JJH7
RefSeq (mRNA)	NM_014555	NM_020277
RefSeq (protein)	NP_055370	NP_064673
Location (UCSC)	Chr 11: 2.4 – 2.44 Mb	Chr 7: 142.62 – 142.65 Mb
PubMed search
- Wikidata
View/Edit Human	View/Edit Mouse

Transient receptor potential cation channel subfamily M member 5 (TRPM5), also known as long transient receptor potential channel 5, is a protein that in humans is encoded by the TRPM5 gene.

== Function ==
TRPM5 is a calcium-activated non-selective cation channel that induces depolarization upon increases in intracellular calcium, it is a signal mediator in chemosensory cells. Channel activity is initiated by a rise in the intracellular calcium, and the channel permeates monovalent cations as K^{+} and Na^{+}. TRPM5 is a key component of taste transduction in the gustatory system of bitter, sweet and umami tastes being activated by high levels of intracellular calcium. It has also been targeted as a possible contributor to fat taste signaling. The calcium dependent opening of TRPM5 produces a depolarizing generator potential which leads to an action potential.

TRPM5 is expressed in pancreatic β-cells where it is involved in the signaling mechanism for insulin secretion. The potentiation of TRPM5 in the β-cells leads to increased insulin secretion and protects against the development of type 2 diabetes in mice. Further expression of TRPM5 can be found in tuft cells, solitary chemosensory cells and several other cell types in the body that have a sensory role.

== Drugs modulating TRPM5 ==
The role of TRPM5 in the pancreatic β-cell makes it a target for the development of novel antidiabetic therapies.

=== Agonists ===
- Steviol glycosides, the sweet compounds in the leaves of the Stevia rebaudiana plant, potentiate the calcium-induced activity of TRPM5. In this way they stimulate the glucose-induced insulin secretion from the pancreatic β-cell.
- Rutamarin, a phytochemical found in Ruta graveolens has been identified as an activator of several TRP channels, including TRPM5 and TRPV1 and inhibits the activity of TRPM8.

=== Antagonists ===
Selective blocking agents of TRPM5 ion channels can be used to identify TRPM5 currents in primary cells. Most identified compounds show, however, a poor selectivity between TRPM4 and TRPM5 or other ion channels.

- TPPO or TriPhenylPhosphineOxide is the most selective blocker of TRPM5 however, its application suffers due to a poor solubility.
- Ketoconazole is an antifungal drug that inhibits TRPM5 activity.
- Flufenamic Acid is an NSAID drug that inhibits the activity of TRPM5 or TRPM4.
- Clotrimazole is an antifungal drug and reduces the currents through TRPM5.
- Nicotine inhibits the TRPM5 channel. Through the inhibition of TRPM5, the taste loss observed in people with a smoking habit can be explained.

== See also ==
- TRPM
