= TRPM2 =

Protein-coding gene in the species Homo sapiens

Identifiers
- Aliases: TRPM2, Trpm2, 9830168K16Rik, C79133, LTRPC2, TRPC7, Trp7, Trrp7, EREG1, KNP3, NUDT9H, NUDT9L1, LTrpC-2, transient receptor potential cation channel subfamily M member 2
- External IDs: OMIM: 603749; MGI: 1351901; GeneCards: TRPM2

Gene location (Human)
Chr.	Chromosome 21 (human)
Band	21q22.3	Start	44,350,163 bp
Band	21q22.3	End	44,443,081 bp

Gene location (Mouse)
Chr.	Chromosome 10 (mouse)
Band	10 C1|10 39.72 cM	Start	77,907,722 bp
Band	10 C1|10 39.72 cM	End	77,970,563 bp
RNA expression pattern
Bgee	Human / Mouse (ortholog); Top expressed in: right frontal lobe; caudate nucleus; nucleus accumbens; monocyte; putamen; cingulate gyrus; Brodmann area 9; anterior cingulate cortex; granulocyte; right hemisphere of cerebellum / Top expressed in: granulocyte; lumbar subsegment of spinal cord; mesenteric lymph nodes; spleen; primary visual cortex; superior frontal gyrus; dentate gyrus of hippocampal formation granule cell; cerebellar cortex; blood; bone marrow; More reference expression data
BioGPS	n/a
Gene ontology
Molecular function	calcium channel activity; sodium channel activity; ion channel activity; cation channel activity; calcium ion binding; calcium-release channel activity; hydrolase activity; ligand-gated calcium channel activity; metal ion binding; ADP-ribose diphosphatase activity; mono-ADP-D-ribose binding
Cellular component	integral component of membrane; membrane; plasma membrane; lysosome; lysosomal membrane; integral component of plasma membrane; cytoplasmic vesicle membrane; cytoplasmic vesicle; specific granule membrane; cell projection; perikaryon; tertiary granule membrane; ficolin-1-rich granule membrane
Biological process	sodium ion transmembrane transport; sodium ion transport; cation transport; ion transport; response to oxidative stress; calcium ion transmembrane transport; calcium ion transport; ion transmembrane transport; transmembrane transport; temperature homeostasis; dendritic cell chemotaxis; response to purine-containing compound; calcium-mediated signaling using intracellular calcium source; neutrophil degranulation; release of sequestered calcium ion into cytosol; regulation of filopodium assembly; cellular response to hydrogen peroxide; cellular response to calcium ion; cellular response to purine-containing compound; cellular response to temperature stimulus; zinc ion transmembrane transport; dendritic cell differentiation; calcium ion transmembrane import into cytosol; regulation of actin cytoskeleton reorganization; calcium ion import across plasma membrane; protein homotetramerization
Sources:Amigo / QuickGO
Orthologs
Databases	NCBI: entry; OMA: entry
Species	Human	Mouse
Entrez	7226	28240
Ensembl	ENSG00000142185	ENSMUSG00000009292
UniProt	O94759	Q91YD4
RefSeq (mRNA)	NM_001001188; NM_003307; NM_001320350; NM_001320351; NM_001320352	NM_138301
RefSeq (protein)	NP_001307279; NP_001307280; NP_001307281; NP_003298	NP_612174
Location (UCSC)	Chr 21: 44.35 – 44.44 Mb	Chr 10: 77.91 – 77.97 Mb
PubMed search
- Wikidata
View/Edit Human	View/Edit Mouse

Transient receptor potential cation channel, subfamily M, member 2, also known as TRPM2, is a protein that in humans is encoded by the TRPM2 gene.

== Structure ==
The protein encoded by this gene is a non-selective calcium-permeable cation channel and is part of the Transient Receptor Potential ion channel super family. The closest relative is the cold and menthol activated TRPM8 ion channel. While TRPM2 is not cold sensitive it is activated by heat. The TRPM2 ion channel is activated by free intracellular ADP-ribose in synergy with free intracellular calcium. ADP-Ribose is produced by the enzyme PARP in response to oxidative stress and confers susceptibility to cell death. Several alternatively spliced transcript variants of this gene have been described, but their full-length nature is not known.

== Function ==
The TRPM2 gene is highly expressed in the brain and was implicated by both genetic linkage studies in families and then by case control or trio allelic association studies in the genetic aetiology of bipolar affective disorder (Manic Depression).

The physiological role of TRPM2 is not well understood. It was shown to be involved in insulin secretion. In the immune cells it mediates parts of the responses to TNF-alpha. A role has been suggested for TRPM2 in activation of NLRP3 inflammasome, the dysregulation of which is strongly associated with a number of auto inflammatory and metabolic diseases, such as gout, obesity and diabetes. In the brain it is involved in the toxicity of amyloid beta, a protein associated with Alzheimer's disease. In 2016, TRPM2 channel was shown to be strongly implicated in the detection of non-painful warm stimuli. Chun-Hsiang Tan and Peter McNaughton studied the responses of actual sensory neurons to thermal stimuli, then used an RNA-sequencing strategy to identify TRPM2 as genetically required for warmth detection in the non-noxious range of 33–38 °C.

== Clinical significance ==
TRPM2 expression and function help preserve cancer cell viability. TRPM2 channels are highly expressed in many cancers, notably neuroblastoma.

== See also ==
- TRPM
