= C16H13N3O4 =

The molecular formula C_{16}H_{13}N_{3}O_{4} (molar mass: 311.29 g/mol, exact mass: 311.0906 u) may refer to:

- Icilin
- Nitromethaqualone
