= PF-04745637 =

Chemical compound

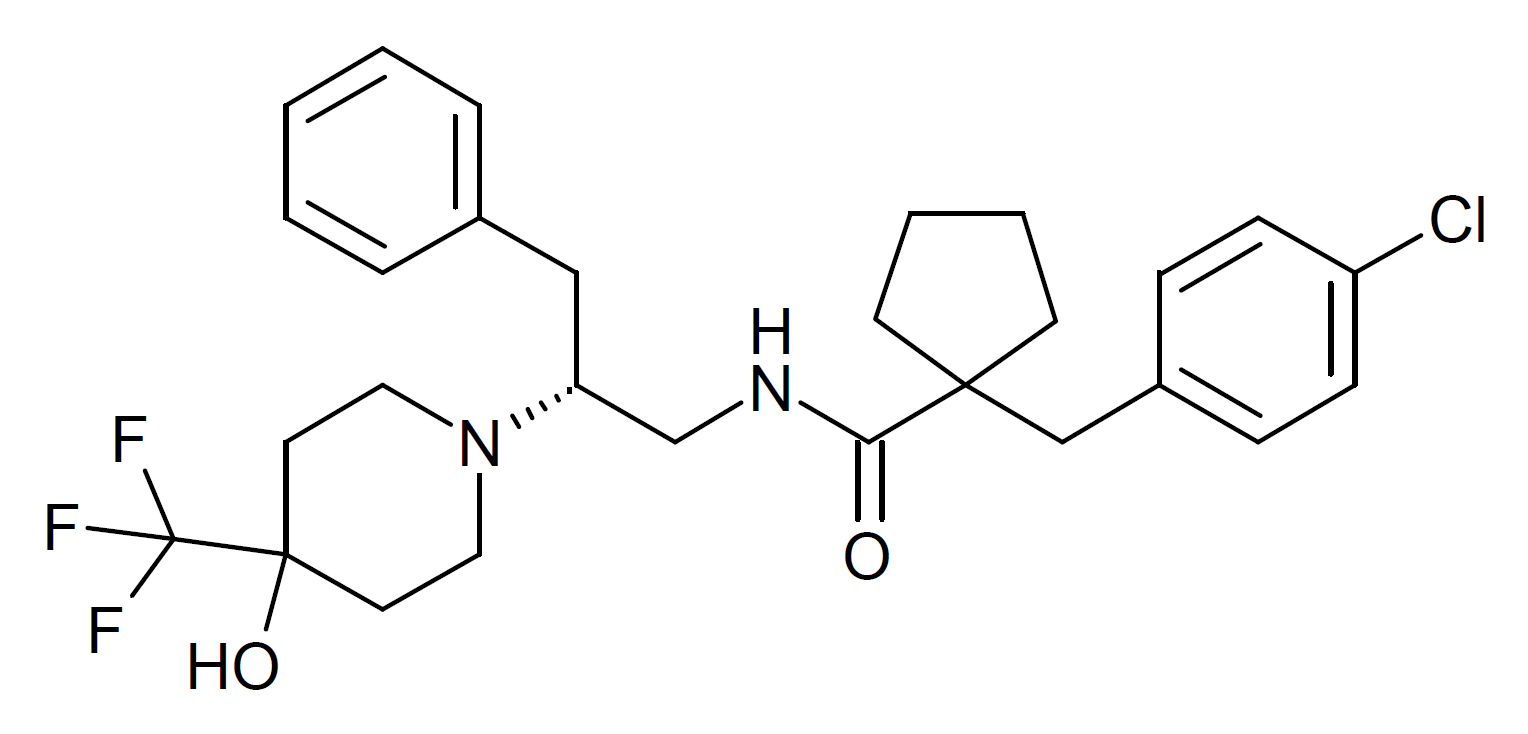

Identifiers
- IUPAC name: 1-(4-chlorophenyl)-N-[(2R)-2-[4-hydroxy-4-(trifluoromethyl)piperidin-1-yl]-3-phenylpropyl]cyclopentane-1-carboxamide
- CAS Number: 1917294-46-2
- PubChem CID: 121304827
- ChEMBL: ChEMBL4208555
- CompTox Dashboard (EPA): DTXSID401336640

Chemical and physical data
- Formula: C_{27}H_{32}ClF_{3}N_{2}O_{2}
- Molar mass: 509.01 g·mol^{−1}
- 3D model (JSmol): Interactive image
- SMILES: C1CCC(C1)(C2=CC=C(C=C2)Cl)C(=O)NC[C@@H](CC3=CC=CC=C3)N4CCC(CC4)(C(F)(F)F)O
- InChI: InChI=1S/C27H32ClF3N2O2/c28-22-10-8-21(9-11-22)25(12-4-5-13-25)24(34)32-19-23(18-20-6-2-1-3-7-20)33-16-14-26(35,15-17-33)27(29,30)31/h1-3,6-11,23,35H,4-5,12-19H2,(H,32,34)/t23-/m1/s1; Key:PAEBEJVPSADOMC-HSZRJFAPSA-N

PF-04745637 is a drug which acts as a potent and selective antagonist for the TRPA1 receptor, with an IC_{50} of 17nM, vs ~3μM at the related TRPV1 and TRPM channels. It has antiinflammatory effects and was developed as a potential treatment for conditions such as atopic dermatitis.
