= TRPM =

Family of transport proteins

TRPM is a family of transient receptor potential ion channels (M standing for wikt:melastatin). Functional TRPM channels are believed to form tetramers. The TRPM family consists of eight different channels, TRPM1–TRPM8.

Unlike the TRPC and TRPV sub-families, TRPM subunits do not contain N-terminal ankyrin repeat motifs but, rather, contain entire functional proteins in their C-termini. TRPM6 and TRPM7, for example, contain functional α-kinase segments, which are a type of serine/threonine-specific protein kinase.

== Permeability and activation ==
The relative permeability of calcium and magnesium varies widely among TRPM channels.

- TRPM4 and TRPM5 are impermeable to calcium.
- TRPM3, TRPM6 and TRPM7 are highly permeable to both calcium and magnesium.

The mechanism of activation also varies greatly among TRPM channels.

- TRPM2 is activated by ADP-ribose adenosine 5'-diphosphoribose and functions as a sensor of redox status in cells.
- TRPM4 and TRPM5 are activated by intracellular calcium.
- TRPM8 can be activated by low temperatures, menthol, eucalyptol and icilin.

== Functions ==
Among the functional responsibilities of the TRPM channels are:

- regulation of calcium oscillations after T cell activation and prevention of cardiac conduction disorders (TRPM4).
- modulation of insulin secretion and sensory transduction in taste cells (TRPM5).
- cold sensation (TRPM8).
- heat sensation and inflammatory pain (TRPM3).
- regulation of magnesium reabsorption in the kidneys and absorption in the intestines (TRPM6).
- regulation of cell adhesion (TRPM7).

== Genes ==
- TRPM1, TRPM2, TRPM3, TRPM4, TRPM5, TRPM6, TRPM7, TRPM8
