= Acoltremon =

Chemical compound

- Molecular structure of acoltremon

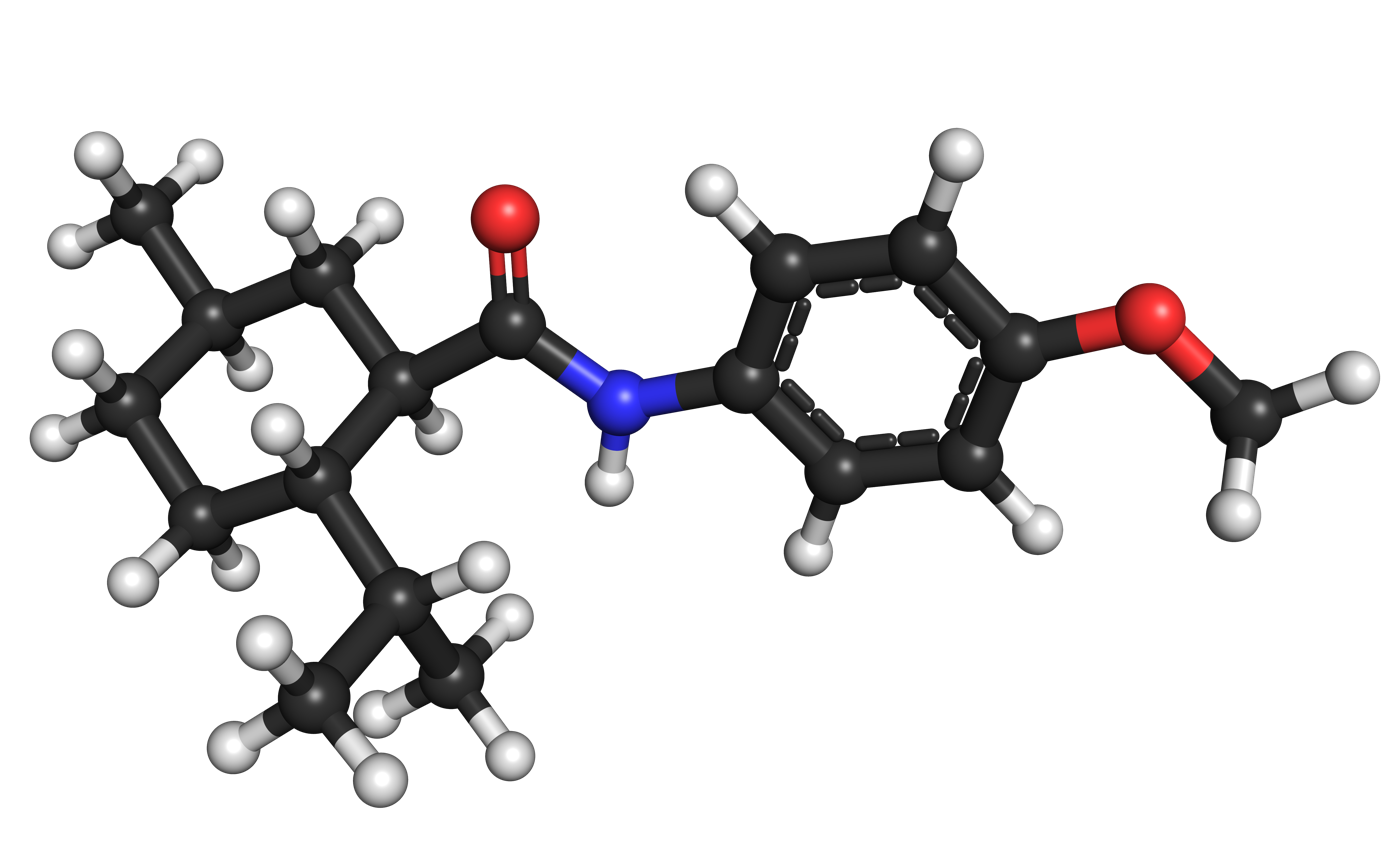
- 3D representation of an acoltremon molecule

Clinical data
- Trade names: Tryptyr
- Other names: AVX-012, WS-12
- AHFS/Drugs.com: Monograph
- MedlinePlus: a625071
- License data: US DailyMed: Acoltremon
- Routes of administration: Eye drop
- ATC code: None

Legal status
- Legal status: US: ℞-only

Identifiers
- IUPAC name: (1R,2S,5R)-N-(4-methoxyphenyl)-5-methyl-2-propan-2-ylcyclohexane-1-carboxamide
- CAS Number: 68489-09-8
- PubChem CID: 11266244
- DrugBank: DB19202
- ChemSpider: 9441255
- UNII: 1L7BVT4Z4Z
- KEGG: D13125
- ChEMBL: ChEMBL2441929
- CompTox Dashboard (EPA): DTXSID10460636

Chemical and physical data
- Formula: C_{18}H_{27}NO_{2}
- Molar mass: 289.419 g·mol^{−1}
- 3D model (JSmol): Interactive image
- SMILES: C[C@@H]1CC[C@H]([C@@H](C1)C(=O)NC2=CC=C(C=C2)OC)C(C)C
- InChI: InChI=1S/C18H27NO2/c1-12(2)16-10-5-13(3)11-17(16)18(20)19-14-6-8-15(21-4)9-7-14/h6-9,12-13,16-17H,5,10-11H2,1-4H3,(H,19,20)/t13-,16+,17-/m1/s1; Key:HNSGVPAAXJJOPQ-XOKHGSTOSA-N

Acoltremon sold under the brand name Tryptyr, is a medication used for the treatment of dry eye syndrome. Acoltremon is a transient receptor potential melastatin 8 (TRPM8) thermoreceptor agonist. It is used as an eye drop.

The most common treatment-emergent adverse event experienced during the clinical studies was instillation site pain (burning or stinging) events.

Acoltremon was approved for medical use in the United States in May 2025. The US Food and Drug Administration considers it to be a first-in-class medication.

== Medical uses ==
Acoltremon is indicated for the treatment of the signs and symptoms of dry eye disease.

== Pharmacology ==
Acoltremon acts as a potent and selective activator (opener) of the TRPM8 calcium channel, which is responsible for the sensation of coldness produced by menthol. It is slightly less potent as a TRPM8 activator compared to icilin, but is a much more selective TRPM8 ligand when compared to menthol.

== History ==
The US Food and Drug Administration (FDA) approved acoltremon based on evidence from two clinical trials (COMET-2 and COMET-3) of 931 participants with dry eye disease. The trials were conducted at 46 sites in the United States. Two additional studies: COMET-1 and COMET-4 were included in the evaluation of safety benefit of acoltremon. The number of participants representing efficacy findings may differ from the number of participants representing safety findings due to different pools of study participants analyzed for efficacy and safety. Both COMET-2 and COMET-3 are phase III, multi-center, vehicle-controlled, double-masked, randomized studies whose primary endpoint was proportion of participants with ≥10 mm increase from baseline in unanesthetized Schirmer Score on day 14. COMET-1 was a phase IIb multi-center, vehicle-controlled, double-masked, randomized study conducted at 15 sites in the United States which randomized 369 participants with a history of dry eye disease. COMET-4 was a multi-center, vehicle-controlled, double-masked, randomized study conducted at approximately 10 sites in the United States which enrolled 275 participants with a history of dry eye disease. Study COMET-2 and COMET-3 have a similar design. Each study is a multi-center, randomized, double-masked, vehicle-controlled phase III study. The primary objective of these studies was to evaluate the safety and efficacy of acoltremon compared to vehicle. Participants 30 years and older with a history of artificial tear use for dry eye disease were qualified based on signs and symptoms of dry eye disease at screening, and were requalified at baseline (day 1) following a 14-day vehicle run-in. COMET 2 enrolled 465 participants at 23 study sites, whereas COMET-3 enrolled 466 participants at 23 sites.

== Society and culture ==
=== Legal status ===
Acoltremon was approved for medical use in the United States in May 2025.

=== Names ===
Acoltremon is the international nonproprietary name.

Acoltremon is sold under the brand name Tryptyr.
