= FP802 =

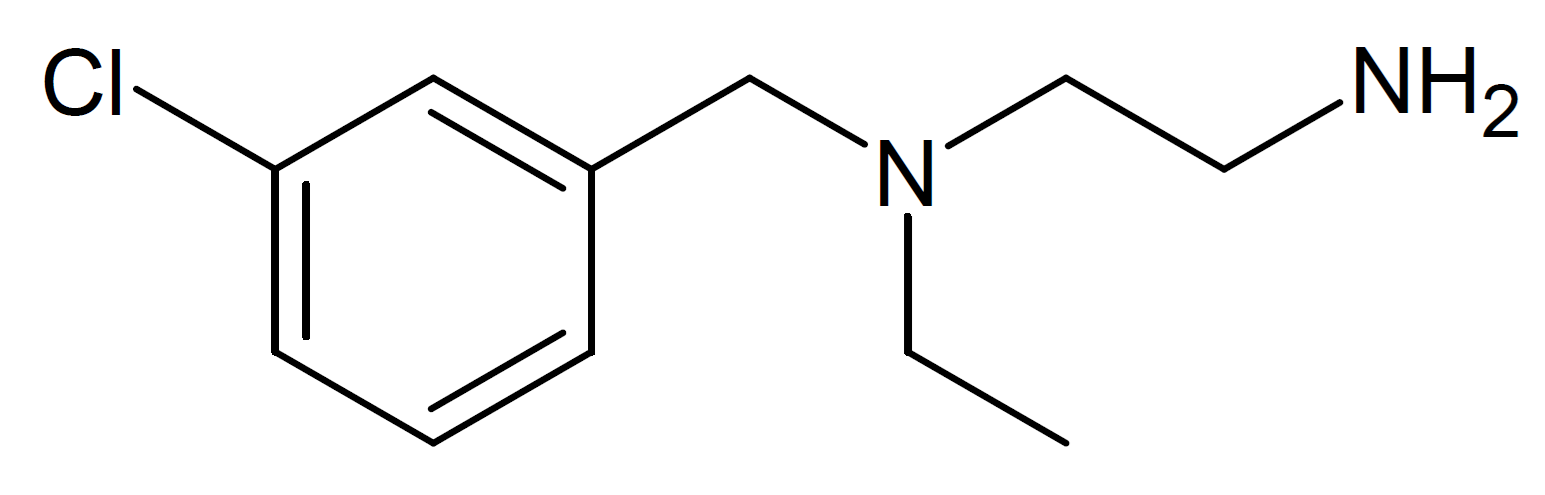

Identifiers
- IUPAC name: N'-[(3-chlorophenyl)methyl]-N'-ethylethane-1,2-diamine
- CAS Number: 61694-81-3
- PubChem CID: 12861871
- ChemSpider: 15292420
- CompTox Dashboard (EPA): DTXSID70511754

Chemical and physical data
- Formula: C_{11}H_{17}ClN_{2}
- Molar mass: 212.72 g·mol^{−1}
- 3D model (JSmol): Interactive image
- SMILES: CCN(CCN)CC1=CC(=CC=C1)Cl
- InChI: InChI=1S/C11H17ClN2/c1-2-14(7-6-13)9-10-4-3-5-11(12)8-10/h3-5,8H,2,6-7,9,13H2,1H3; Key:CEGPYWJJEVYOQS-UHFFFAOYSA-N

FP802 is a chemical compound which has neuroprotective effects. It is a TwinF interface inhibitor which prevents the NMDA receptor from forming a complex with the signalling factor TRPM4, and so blocks NMDA-induced neurotoxicity but without disrupting basal levels of NMDA signalling. It shows beneficial effects in animal models of conditions such as Alzheimer's disease and amyotrophic lateral sclerosis.
