= WS-23 =

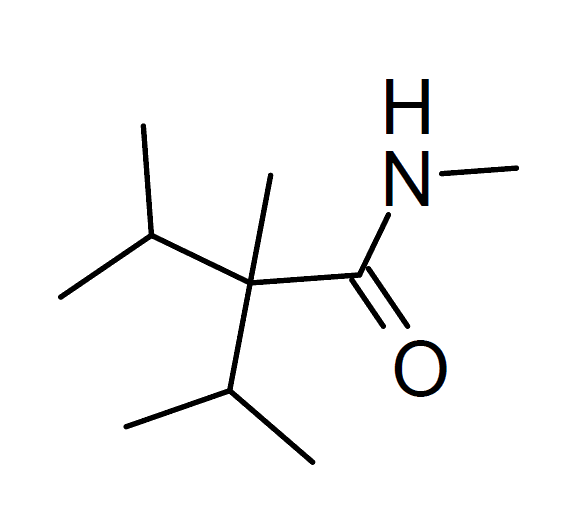

Identifiers
- IUPAC name: N,2,3-trimethyl-2-propan-2-ylbutanamide
- CAS Number: 51115-67-4
- PubChem CID: 65300
- IUPHAR/BPS: 2474
- ChemSpider: 58789
- UNII: 6QOP5A9489
- ChEBI: CHEBI:169004
- CompTox Dashboard (EPA): DTXSID40199124
- ECHA InfoCard: 100.051.778

Chemical and physical data
- Formula: C_{10}H_{21}NO
- Molar mass: 171.284 g·mol^{−1}
- 3D model (JSmol): Interactive image
- SMILES: CC(C)C(C)(C(C)C)C(=O)NC
- InChI: InChI=1S/C10H21NO/c1-7(2)10(5,8(3)4)9(12)11-6/h7-8H,1-6H3,(H,11,12); Key:RWAXQWRDVUOOGG-UHFFFAOYSA-N

WS-23 (methyl diisopropyl propionamide, 2-isopropyl-N,2,3-trimethylbutanamide) is a chemical compound which acts as an activator (opener) of the so-called "menthol receptor", the TRPM8 calcium channel, though with relatively low affinity and it may also act at other targets. It produces a similar cooling effect to menthol, and is commonly used as an ingredient of vape liquid for e-cigarettes.
