= 9-Phenanthrol =

Names
- IUPAC name 9-Phenanthrol
- Systematic IUPAC name 9-Hydroxyphenanthrene
- Other names: 9-Phenanthrol; 9-Phenanthrenol; Phenanthren-9-ol; 9-Hydroxyphenanthrene

Identifiers
CAS Number	484-17-3
3D model (JSmol)	Interactive image
ChEBI	CHEBI:28820
ChEMBL	ChEMBL2407182
ChemSpider	9812
ECHA InfoCard	100.006.912
EC Number	207-602-4
KEGG	C11430
PubChem CID	10229
UNII	9FYU45OV9H
CompTox Dashboard (EPA)	DTXSID9047592
- InChI: InChI=1S/C14H10O/c15-14-9-10-5-1-2-6-11(10)12-7-3-4-8-13(12)14/h1-9,15H Key: DZKIUEHLEXLYKM-UHFFFAOYSA-N
- SMILES: C1=CC=C2C(=C1)C=C(C3=CC=CC=C23)O

Properties
Chemical formula	C_{14}H_{10}O
Molar mass	194.233 g·mol^{−1}

Hazards
- GHS labelling
Pictograms	(GHS07: Exclamation mark)
Signal word	Warning
Hazard statements	H315, H319, H335
Precautionary statements	P261, P264, P271, P280, P302+P352, P304+P340, P305+P351+P338, P312, P321, P332+P313, P337+P313, P362, P403+P233, P405, P501
- Except where otherwise noted, data are given for materials in their standard state (at 25 °C [77 °F], 100 kPa). Infobox references

9-Phenanthrol is an aromatic alcohol derived from phenanthrene, a tricyclic compound. It is a TRPM4 channel inhibitor. It can prevent the pancreas from secreting insulin when stimulated by glucose.
