= PF-05105679 =

Chemical compound

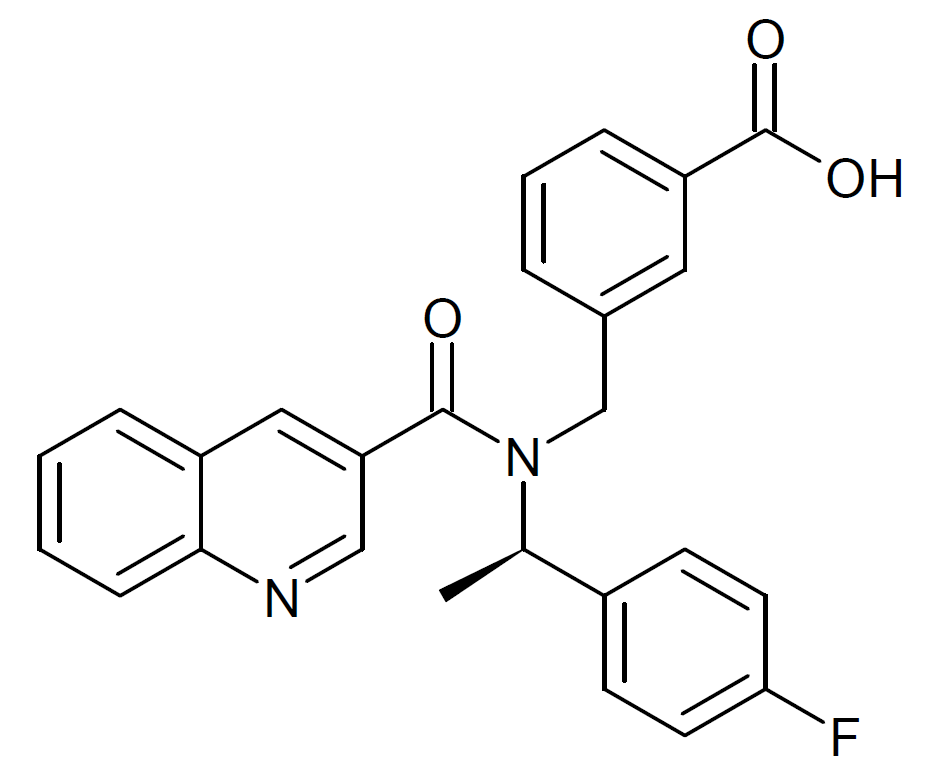

Identifiers
- IUPAC name: 3-({[(1R)-1-(4-fluorophenyl)ethyl]-(quinoline-3-carbonyl)amino}methyl)benzoic acid
- CAS Number: 1398583-31-7
- PubChem CID: 60195662
- DrugBank: DB15450
- ChemSpider: 57871141
- UNII: F2B10OFV7Y
- ChEMBL: ChEMBL3577885
- CompTox Dashboard (EPA): DTXSID301336742

Chemical and physical data
- Formula: C_{26}H_{21}FN_{2}O_{3}
- Molar mass: 428.463 g·mol^{−1}
- 3D model (JSmol): Interactive image
- SMILES: C[C@H](C1=CC=C(C=C1)F)N(CC2=CC(=CC=C2)C(=O)O)C(=O)C3=CC4=CC=CC=C4N=C3
- InChI: InChI=1S/C26H21FN2O3/c1-17(19-9-11-23(27)12-10-19)29(16-18-5-4-7-21(13-18)26(31)32)25(30)22-14-20-6-2-3-8-24(20)28-15-22/h2-15,17H,16H2,1H3,(H,31,32)/t17-/m1/s1; Key:BXNMZRPTQFVRFA-QGZVFWFLSA-N

PF-05105679 is a drug which acts as a potent and selective blocker of the TRPM8 ion channel, which is the main receptor responsible for the sensation of cold. It was developed as a potential analgesic, and blocks the sensation of cold in both animals and human trials. It also lowers core body temperature in small mammals, but does not produce this effect in humans in the normal dosage range.

== See also ==
- AMG-333
- RQ-00203078
