= Menthyl nicotinate =

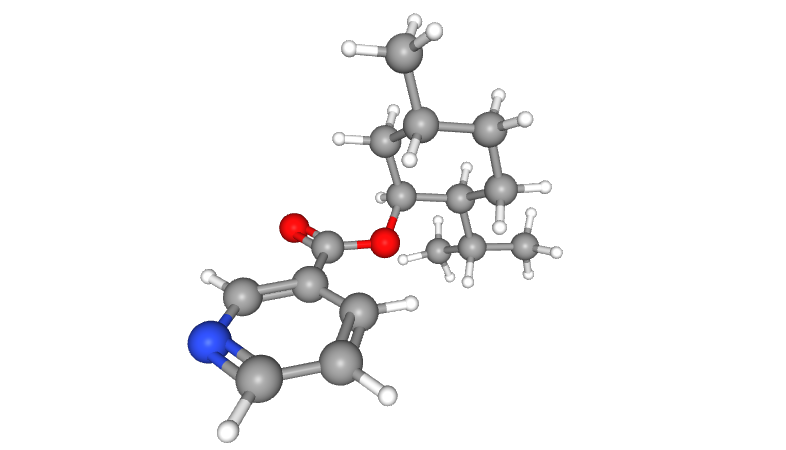

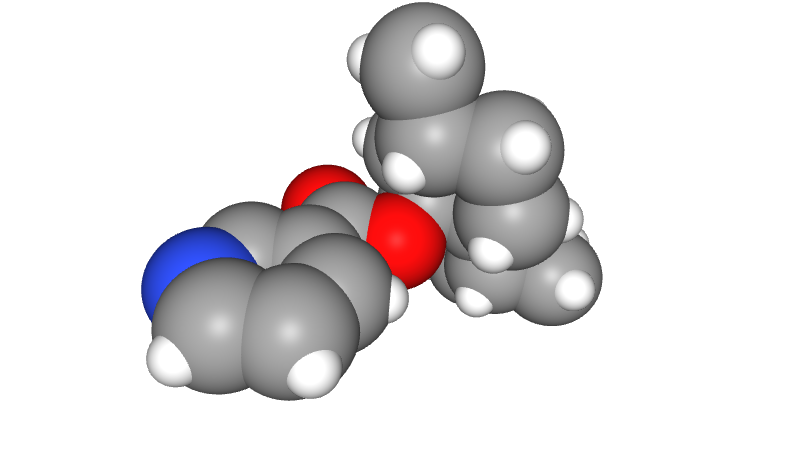

Names
- IUPAC name p-Menthan-3-yl pyridine-3-carboxylate
- Systematic IUPAC name 5-Methyl-2-(propan-2-yl)cyclohexyl pyridine-3-carboxylate
- Other names: 5-methyl-2-(isopropyl) cyclohexyl nicotinate; Nicotinic acid p-menthan-3-yl ester; 3-Pyridinecarboxylicacid, 5-methyl-2-(1-methylethyl)cyclohexyl ester; Menthyl nicotinate

Identifiers
CAS Number	40594-65-8
3D model (JSmol)	Interactive image
ChemSpider	14685547
ECHA InfoCard	100.049.975
EC Number	254-991-1
PubChem CID	13773421
UNII	XF9Y6AK57V
CompTox Dashboard (EPA)	DTXSID60961007
- InChI: InChI=1/C16H23NO2/c1-11(2)14-7-6-12(3)9-15(14)19-16(18)13-5-4-8-17-10-13/h4-5,8,10-12,14-15H,6-7,9H2,1-3H3
- SMILES: CC(C)C1CCC(C)CC1OC(=O)C1=CN=CC=C1

Properties
Chemical formula	C_{16}H_{23}NO_{2}
Molar mass	261.365 g·mol^{−1}
Appearance	Colorless liquid
Odor	Odorless at room temperature, aromatic minty odor if warmed up
Density	1.031 g/mL at 20 °C
Melting point	< −20 °C (−4 °F; 253 K)
Boiling point	292.23 °C (558.01 °F; 565.38 K)
Solubility in water	Insoluble
Solubility	Soluble in polar oils, ethanol, organic solvents
log P	5.09 @ 20 °C
Vapor pressure	10 Pa @ 20 °C

Hazards
- Occupational safety and health (OHS/OSH)
Main hazards	Eye irritant
- GHS labelling
Pictograms	(GHS07: Exclamation mark)
Signal word	Warning
Hazard statements	H319
Precautionary statements	P305+P351+P338
Flash point	165 °C (329 °F; 438 K) @ 101 kPa
Autoignition temperature	354 °C (669 °F; 627 K) @ 102.3 kPa
- Except where otherwise noted, data are given for materials in their standard state (at 25 °C [77 °F], 100 kPa). Infobox references

Menthyl nicotinate is an organic compound with the formula C_{16}H_{23}NO_{2}. It is the ester of nicotinic acid (niacin, vitamin B3) and menthol. At room temperature, menthyl nicotinate is a colorless, odorless, viscous liquid.

Being a topical lipophilic niacin derivative, menthyl nicotinate is used in cosmetics and personal care products, personal lubricants and intimate hygiene compositions.

Menthyl nicotinate is rapidly absorbed through the stratum corneum and slowly hydrolyzed by skin esterase into niacin and menthol. Such time-dependent release of niacin and menthol, in an equimolar ratio, prevents the excessive niacin-flush effect that is usually observed with other nicotinates.

Niacin is a precursor to coenzyme nicotinamide adenine dinucleotide (NAD), which is essential to all cellular processes involved in immune response and DNA-repairing of photodamaged skin cells.

Niacin has also been used and tested for the purpose of enhancing detoxification by removing skin lipid-stored xenobiotics.

In vitro testing has evidenced menthyl nicotinate's fast skin absorption kinetics and slow percutaneous delivery of niacin.

Its antioxidant, antipollution, and protective efficacy against different kinds of damaging agents (UV radiation, oxidizing agents, urban particulates, and cigarette smoke) has also been evaluated. Results indicate that menthyl nicotinate significantly enhances skin barrier function.
