= AMG-333 =

Drug which acts as a potent and selective blocker of the TRPM8 ion channel

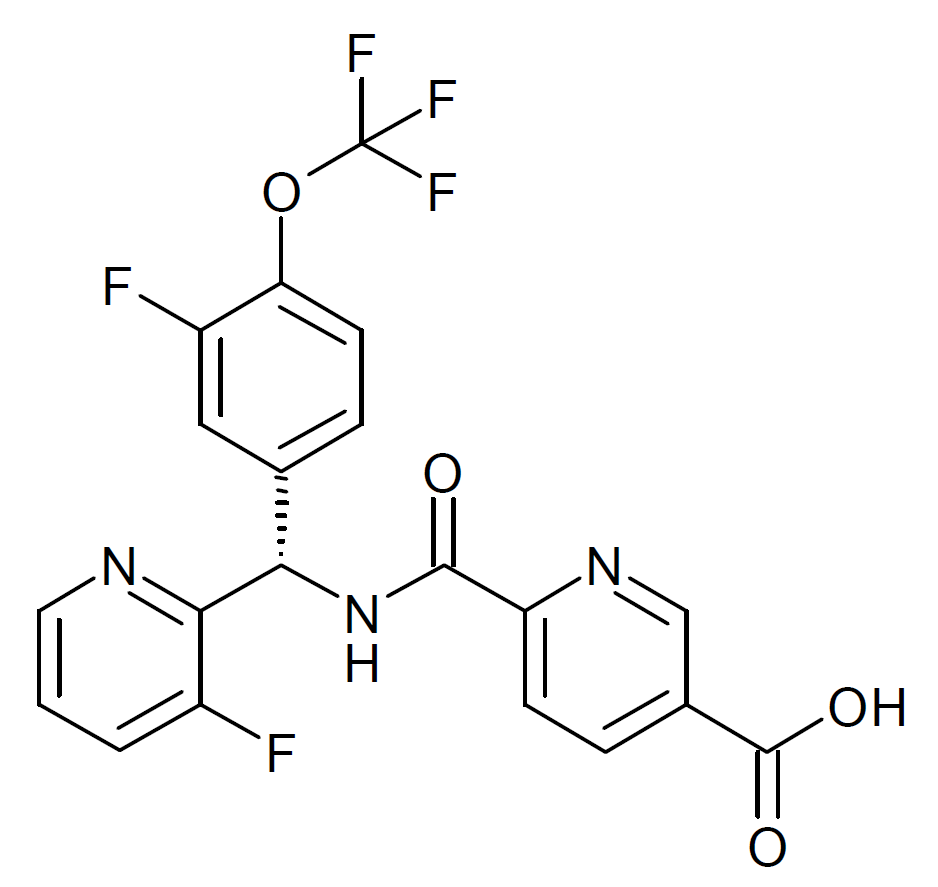

Identifiers
- IUPAC name: 6-{[(S)-(3-fluoropyridin-2-yl)-[3-fluoro-4-(trifluoromethoxy)phenyl]methyl]carbamoyl}pyridine-3-carboxylic acid
- CAS Number: 1416799-28-4
- PubChem CID: 71144018
- ChemSpider: 72380128
- UNII: FR70864511
- ChEMBL: ChEMBL4241349

Chemical and physical data
- Formula: C_{20}H_{12}F_{5}N_{3}O_{4}
- Molar mass: 453.325 g·mol^{−1}
- 3D model (JSmol): Interactive image
- SMILES: C1=CC(=C(N=C1)[C@H](C2=CC(=C(C=C2)OC(F)(F)F)F)NC(=O)C3=NC=C(C=C3)C(=O)O)F
- InChI: InChI=1S/C20H12F5N3O4/c21-12-2-1-7-26-17(12)16(10-4-6-15(13(22)8-10)32-20(23,24)25)28-18(29)14-5-3-11(9-27-14)19(30)31/h1-9,16H,(H,28,29)(H,30,31)/t16-/m0/s1; Key:QEBYISWYMFIXOZ-INIZCTEOSA-N

AMG-333 is a drug which acts as a potent and selective blocker of the TRPM8 ion channel, which is the main receptor responsible for the sensation of cold. It was developed as a potential treatment for migraine.

== See also ==
- PF-05105679
- RQ-00203078
