= TRPM4-IN-5 =

Chemical compound

Identifiers
- IUPAC name: 4-chloro-2-{[2-(2-chlorophenoxy)acetyl]amino}benzoic acid
- CAS Number: 351424-20-9
- PubChem CID: 2264067
- ChemSpider: 1692848

Chemical and physical data
- Formula: C_{15}H_{11}Cl_{2}NO_{4}
- Molar mass: 340.16 g·mol^{−1}
- 3D model (JSmol): Interactive image
- SMILES: C1=CC=C(C(=C1)OCC(=O)NC2=C(C=CC(=C2)Cl)C(=O)O)Cl
- InChI: InChI=1S/C15H11Cl2NO4/c16-9-5-6-10(15(20)21)12(7-9)18-14(19)8-22-13-4-2-1-3-11(13)17/h1-7H,8H2,(H,18,19)(H,20,21); Key:CVQCJPCMPGKEDH-UHFFFAOYSA-N

TRPM4-IN-5 is a drug which acts as a moderately potent but highly selective blocker of the TRPM4 ion channel, with an IC_{50} of 1.5 μM. It is protective against glutamate mediated neuronal excitotoxicity.
