= RQ-00203078 =

Chemical compound

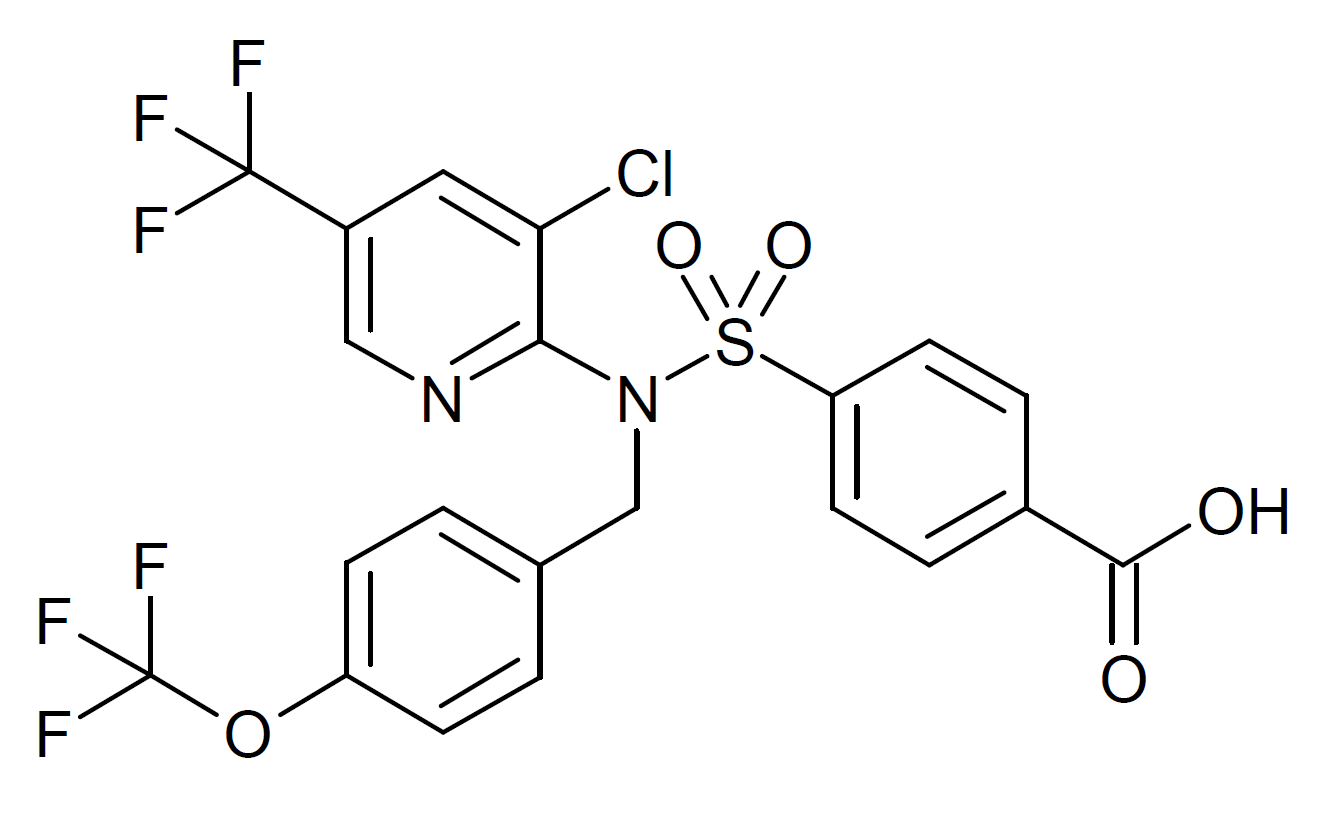

Identifiers
- IUPAC name: 4-([3-chloro-5-(trifluoromethyl)pyridin-2-yl]-{[4-(trifluoromethoxy)phenyl]methyl}sulfamoyl)benzoic acid
- CAS Number: 1254205-52-1
- PubChem CID: 49783953
- ChemSpider: 34979854
- ChEMBL: ChEMBL3353597

Chemical and physical data
- Formula: C_{21}H_{13}ClF_{6}N_{2}O_{5}S
- Molar mass: 554.84 g·mol^{−1}
- 3D model (JSmol): Interactive image
- SMILES: C1=CC(=CC=C1CN(C2=C(C=C(C=N2)C(F)(F)F)Cl)S(=O)(=O)C3=CC=C(C=C3)C(=O)O)OC(F)(F)F
- InChI: InChI=1S/C21H13ClF6N2O5S/c22-17-9-14(20(23,24)25)10-29-18(17)30(11-12-1-5-15(6-2-12)35-21(26,27)28)36(33,34)16-7-3-13(4-8-16)19(31)32/h1-10H,11H2,(H,31,32); Key:IJGQFZYYEHCCIZ-UHFFFAOYSA-N

RQ-00203078 is a drug which acts as a potent and selective blocker of the TRPM8 ion channel, which is the main receptor responsible for the sensation of cold. It was developed as a potential analgesic, and blocks the development of hyperalgesia following exposure to cold temperatures or chronic morphine administration.

== See also ==
- AMG-333
- PF-05105679
