= TRPM8 =

Protein-coding gene in humans

Identifiers
- Aliases: TRPM8, LTRPC6, TRPP8, transient receptor potential cation channel subfamily M member 8, trp-p8, LTrpC-6
- External IDs: OMIM: 606678; MGI: 2181435; GeneCards: TRPM8

Gene location (Human)
| Chr. | Chromosome 2 (human) |
| Band | 2q37.1 | Start | 233,917,373 bp |
| Band | 2q37.1 | End | 234,019,522 bp |

Gene location (Mouse)
| Chr. | Chromosome 1 (mouse) |
| Band | 1|1 D | Start | 88,205,383 bp |
| Band | 1|1 D | End | 88,317,015 bp |
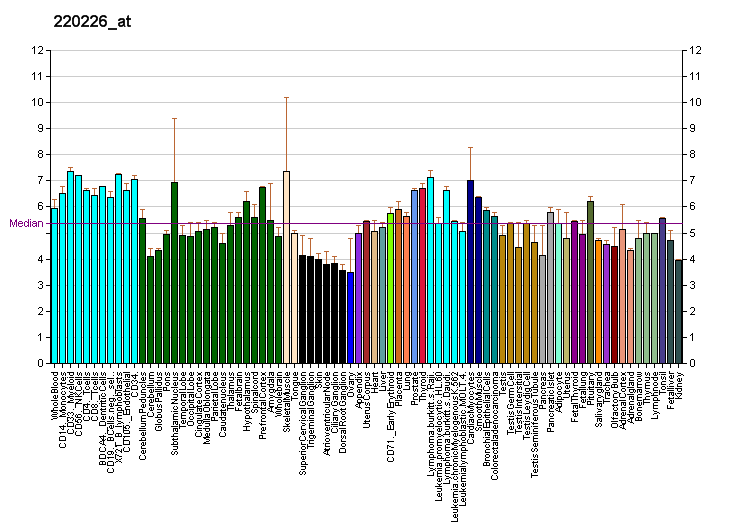
RNA expression pattern
| Bgee | Human / Mouse (ortholog); Top expressed in: right lobe of liver; prostate; testicle; pancreatic ductal cell; trigeminal ganglion; amniotic fluid; islet of Langerhans; gonad; endometrium; left testis / Top expressed in: seminiferous tubule; spinal ganglia; spermatid; cerebellar cortex; spermatocyte; More reference expression data |
| BioGPS | More reference expression data |
Gene ontology
| Molecular function | protein homodimerization activity; ion channel activity; protein binding; calcium channel activity |
| Cellular component | integral component of membrane; endoplasmic reticulum membrane; membrane; endoplasmic reticulum; membrane raft; external side of plasma membrane; plasma membrane |
| Biological process | response to stimulus; sensory perception of temperature stimulus; cellular calcium ion homeostasis; cation transport; ion transport; protein homotrimerization; response to cold; detection of temperature stimulus; protein homotetramerization; thermoception; calcium ion transport; response to temperature stimulus; transmembrane transport; calcium ion transmembrane transport |
Sources:Amigo / QuickGO
Orthologs
| Databases | NCBI: entry; OMA: entry |
| Species | Human | Mouse |
| Entrez | 79054 | 171382 |
| Ensembl | ENSG00000144481 | ENSMUSG00000036251 |
| UniProt | Q7Z2W7 | Q8R4D5 |
| RefSeq (mRNA) | NM_024080 | NM_134252 |
| RefSeq (protein) | NP_076985 | NP_599013 |
| Location (UCSC) | Chr 2: 233.92 – 234.02 Mb | Chr 1: 88.21 – 88.32 Mb |
| PubMed search |
- Wikidata
| View/Edit Human | View/Edit Mouse |

Transient receptor potential cation channel subfamily M (melastatin) member 8 (TRPM8), also known as the cold and menthol receptor 1 (CMR1), is a protein that in humans is encoded by the TRPM8 gene. The TRPM8 channel is the primary molecular transducer of cold somatosensation in humans. In addition, mints can desensitize a region through the activation of TRPM8 receptors (the 'cold'/menthol receptor).

== Structure ==
The TRPM8 channel is a homotetramer, composed of four identical subunits with a transmembrane domain with six helices (S1–6). The first four, S1–4, act as the voltage sensor and allow binding of menthol, icilin and similar channel agonists. S5 and S6 and a connecting loop, also part of the structure, make up the pore, a non-selective cation channel which consists of a highly conserved hydrophobic region. A range of diverse components are required for the high level of specificity in response to cold and menthol stimuli which eventually lead to ion flow through the protein channel.

== Function ==
TRPM8 is an ion channel: upon activation, it allows the entry of Na^{+} and Ca^{2+} ions into the cell, which leads to depolarization and the generation of an action potential. The signal is conducted from primary afferents (type C- and A-delta) eventually leading to the sensation of cold and cold pain.

The TRPM8 protein is expressed in sensory neurons, and it is activated by cold temperatures and cooling agents, such as menthol and icilin whereas WS-12 and CPS-369 are the most selective agonists of TRPM8.

TRPM8 is also expressed in the prostate, lungs, and bladder where its function is not well understood.

=== Role in the nervous system ===
The transient receptor potential channel (TRP) superfamily, which includes the menthol (TRPM8) and capsaicin receptors (TRPV1), serve a variety of functions in the peripheral and central nervous systems. In the peripheral nervous system, TRPs respond to stimuli from temperature, pressure, inflammatory agents, and receptor activation. Central nervous system roles of the receptors include neurite outgrowth, receptor signaling, and excitotoxic cell death resulting from noxious stimuli.

McKemy et al., 2002 provided some of the first evidence for existence of a cold-activated receptor throughout the mammalian somatosensory system. Using calcium imaging and patch clamp based approaches, they showed a response in dorsal root ganglion (DRG) neurons that exposure to cold, 20 °C or cooler, lead to a response in calcium influx. This receptor was shown to respond to both cold temperatures, menthol, and similar now-known agonists of the TRPM8 receptor. It works in conjunction with the TRPV1 receptor to maintain a feasible threshold temperature range in which our cells are comfortable and our perception of these stimuli occurs at the spinal cord and brain, which integrate signals from different fibers of varying sensitivity to temperature. Application of menthol to skin or mucous membranes results directly in membrane depolarization, followed by calcium influx via voltage-dependent calcium channels, providing evidence for the role of TRPM8 and other TRP receptors to mediate our sensory interaction with the environment in response to cold in the same way as in response to menthol.

== Properties ==
=== pH-sensitivity ===
In contrast to the TRPV1 (capsaicin) receptor, which is potentiated by low pH, acidic conditions were shown to inhibit the TRPM8 Ca^{2+} response to menthol and icilin (an agonist of the menthol receptor). It is hypothesized the TRPV1 and TRPM8 receptors act together in response to inflammatory conditions: TRPV1, by proton action, increases the burning sensation of pain, while the acidity inhibits TRPM8 to block the more pleasant sensation of coolness in more dire instances of pain.

=== Sensitization ===
Numerous studies have been published investigating the effect of L-menthol application as a model for TRPM8-sensitization. The primary consensus finding is that TRPM8 sensitization increases the sensation of cold pain, also known as cold hyperalgesia. An experiment was done in a double-blind two-way crossover study by applying 40% L-menthol to the forearm, using ethanol as a control. Activation of the TRPM8-receptor channel (the primary menthol receptor channel) resulted in increased sensitization to the menthol stimulus. To investigate the mechanisms of this sensitization, Wasner et al., 2004, performed A fiber conduction blockade of the superficial radial nerve in another group of subjects. This ended up reducing the menthol-induced sensation of cold and hyperalgesia because blocking A fiber conduction resulted in inhibition of a class of group C nerve fiber nociceptors needed to transduce the sensation of pain. They concluded menthol sensitizes cold-sensitive peripheral C nociceptors and activates cold-specific A delta fibers.

=== Desensitization ===
As is common in response to many other sensory stimuli, much experimental evidence exists for the desensitization of human response of TRPM8 receptors to menthol. Testing involving administration of menthol and nicotine-containing cigarettes non-smokers, which induced what they classified as an irritant response, after initial sensitization, showed a declining response in subjects over time, lending itself to the incidence of desensitization. Ethanol, with similar irritant and desensitization properties, was used as a control for nicotine, to distinguish it from menthol-induced response. The menthol receptor was seen to sensitize or desensitize based on cellular conditions, and menthol produces increased activity in Ca^{2+}-voltage gated channels that is not seen in ethanol, cyclohexanol and other irritant controls, suggestive of a specific molecular receptor. Dessirier et al., 2001, also claim the cross-desensitization of menthol receptors can occur by unknown molecular mechanisms, though they hypothesize the importance of Ca^{2+} in reducing cell excitability in a way similar to that in the capsaicin receptor.

Mutagenesis of protein kinase C phosphorylation sites in TRPM8 (wild type serines and threonines replaced by alanine in mutants) reduces the desensitizing response.

Caryophyllene inhibits TRPM8, which helps mammals to improve cold tolerance at low ambient temperatures.

=== Cross-desensitization ===
Cliff et al., 1994, performed a study to discover more about the properties of the menthol receptor and whether menthol had the ability to cross-desensitize with other chemical irritant receptors. Capsaicin was known to cross-desensitize with other irritant agonists, where the same information was not known about menthol. The study involved subjects swishing either menthol or capsaicin for an extended time at regular intervals. There were three significant conclusions about cross-desensitizing: 1) Both chemicals self-desensitize, 2) menthol receptors can desensitize in response to capsaicin, and, most novelly, 3) capsaicin receptors are sensitized in response to menthol.

== Ligands ==
=== Agonists ===
In a search for compounds that activated the TRPM8 cold receptor, compounds that produce a cooling-sensation were sought out from the fragrance industries. Of 70 relevant compounds, the following 10 produced the associated [Ca2+]-increase response in mTRPM8-transfected HEK293 cells used to identify agonists. Experimentally identified and commonly utilized agonists of the menthol receptor include linalool, geraniol, hydroxy-citronellal, icilin, WS-12/Acoltremon, WS-23, Frescolat MGA, Frescolat ML, PMD 38, Coolact P, M8-Ag and Cooling Agent 10. Traditionally used agonists include menthol and borneol.

=== Antagonists ===
BCTC, thio-BCTC, capsazepine and M8-An were identified as antagonists of the TRPM8 receptor. These antagonists physically block the receptor for cold and menthol, by binding to the S1-S4 voltage-sensing domain, preventing response.

- AMG-333
- RQ-00434739
- RQ-00203078
- PF-05105679 cas: [1398583-31-7].
- M8 B
- AMTB
- 5-benzyloxytryptamine
- Anandamide
- N-Arachidonoyl dopamine
- Tetrahydrocannabinol
- Tetrahydrocannabinolic acid
- Cannabidiol
- Cannabidiolic acid
- Cannabigerol
- Tetrahydrocannabivarin
- Tetrahydrocannabivarin Acid
- Cannabidivarin
- Cannabigerolic acid
- Cannabigerovarin
- Cannabichromene
- Cannabinol

== Clinical significance ==
Cold-patches have traditionally been used to induce analgesia or relief in pain which is caused as result of traumatic injuries. The underlying mechanism of cold-induced analgesia remained obscure until the discovery of TRPM8.

One research group has reported that TRPM8 is activated by chemical cooling agents (such as menthol) or when ambient temperatures drop below approximately 26 °C (79 °F), suggesting that it mediates the detection of cold thermal stimuli by primary afferent sensory neurons of afferent nerve fibers.

Three independent research groups have reported that mice lacking functional TRPM8 gene expression are severely impaired in their ability to detect cold temperatures. Remarkably, these animals are deficient in many diverse aspects of cold signaling, including cool and noxious cold perception, injury-evoked sensitization to cold, and cooling-induced analgesia. These animals provide a great deal of insight into the molecular signaling pathways that participate in the detection of cold and painful stimuli. Many research groups, both in universities and pharmaceutical companies, are now actively involved in looking for selective TRPM8 ligands to be used as new generation of neuropathic analgesic drugs.

Low concentrations of TRPM8 agonists such as menthol (or icilin) found to be antihyperalgesic in certain conditions, whereas high concentrations of menthol caused both cold and mechanical hyperalgesia in healthy volunteers.

TRPM8 knockout mice not only indicated that TRPM8 is required for cold sensation but also revealed that TRPM8 mediates both cold and mechanical allodynia in rodent models of neuropathic pain. Furthermore, recently it was shown that TRPM8 antagonists are effective in reversing established pain in neuropathic and visceral pain models.

TRPM8 upregulation in bladder tissues correlates with pain in patients with painful bladder syndromes. Furthermore, TRPM8 is upregulated in many prostate cancer cell lines and Dendreon/Genentech are pursuing an agonist approach to induce apoptosis and prostate cancer cell death.

=== Role in cancer ===
TRPM8 channels may be a target for treating prostate cancer. TRPM8 is an androgen dependent Ca^{2+} channel necessary for prostate cancer cells to survive and grow. Immunofluorescence showed expression of the TRPM8 protein in the ER and plasma membrane of the androgen-responsive LNCaP cell line. TRPM8 was expressed in androgen-insensitive cells, but it was not shown to be needed for their survival. By knockout of TRPM8 with siRNAs targeting TRPM8 mRNAs, the necessity of the TRPM8 receptor was shown in the androgen-dependent cancer cells. This has useful implications in terms of gene therapy, as there are so few treatment options for men with prostate cancer. As an androgen-regulated protein whose function is lost as cancer develops in cells, the TRPM8 protein seems to be especially critical in regulating calcium levels and has recently been proposed as the focus of new drugs used to treat prostate cancer.

== See also ==
- Endocannabinoid system
- TRPM
- Ruthenium red
