= Menthoxypropanediol =

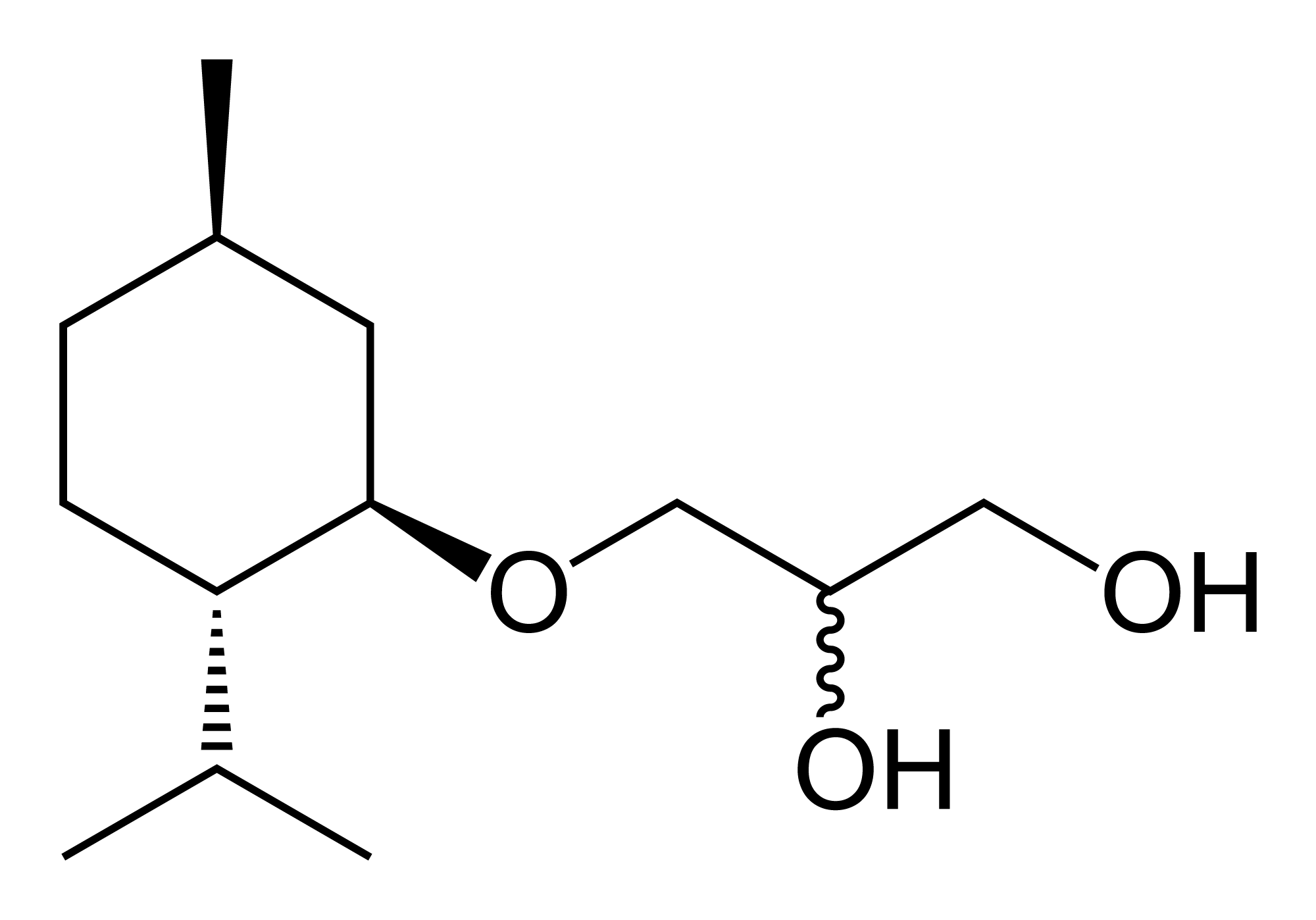
- Stereo skeletal formula of menthoxypropanediol ((1R,2S,5R)-5-meth,-2-prop,-yl)

Names
- IUPAC name Menthoxypropanediol

Identifiers
CAS Number	207792-35-6; 87061-04-9 (non-specific)
3D model (JSmol)	Interactive image
ChemSpider	4515105; 13136530 (2S,5R)-5-meth,-2-prop,-yl; 5254045 (1R,2S,5R)-5-meth,-2-prop,-yl
ECHA InfoCard	100.081.149
EC Number	289-296-2
IUPHAR/BPS	2463
MeSH	3-Menthoxypropane-1,2-diol
PubChem CID	5362595; 16006278 (2S,5R)-5-meth,-2-prop,-yl; 6850757 (1R,2S,5R)-5-meth,-2-prop,-yl; 44467722 (1S,2R,5S)-5-meth,-2-prop,-yl; 15195782 (2S)-2-ol, (1R,2S,5R)-5-meth,-2-prop,-yl
UNII	KD6TZ2QICH
CompTox Dashboard (EPA)	DTXSID20868962
- InChI: InChI=1S/C13H26O3/c1-9(2)12-5-4-10(3)6-13(12)16-8-11(15)7-14/h9-15H,4-8H2,1-3H3 Key: MDVYIGJINBYKOM-UHFFFAOYSA-N
- SMILES: CC(C)C1CCC(C)CC1OCC(O)CO

Properties
Chemical formula	C_{13}H_{26}O_{3}
Molar mass	230.348 g·mol^{−1}
- Except where otherwise noted, data are given for materials in their standard state (at 25 °C [77 °F], 100 kPa). Infobox references

Menthoxypropanediol (also known as Cooling agent 10 [tradename of Takasago]), is a synthetic derivative of menthol. While the cooling strength of 3-(l-menthoxy)propane-1,2-diol is accepted as being about 20–25% that of menthol, it is also noted that "in a Vaseline ointment, 3-(l-menthoxy)propane-1,2-diol shows a cool feeling 2.0 to 2.5 times stronger than that of l-menthol". It is used in various cosmetic chemical concoctions.
