= Icilin =

Names
- Preferred IUPAC name 3-(2-Hydroxyphenyl)-6-(3-nitrophenyl)-3,4-dihydropyrimidin-2(1H)-one
- Other names 1-(2-Hydroxyphenyl)-4-(3-nitrophenyl)-3,6-dihydropyrimidin-2-one; AG-3-5

Identifiers
CAS Number	36945-98-9
3D model (JSmol)	Interactive image
ChemSpider	142218
ECHA InfoCard	100.164.593
IUPHAR/BPS	2429
PubChem CID	161930
UNII	CS70PZQ4QJ
CompTox Dashboard (EPA)	DTXSID70190442
- InChI: InChI=1S/C16H13N3O4/c20-15-7-2-1-6-14(15)18-9-8-13(17-16(18)21)11-4-3-5-12(10-11)19(22)23/h1-8,10,20H,9H2,(H,17,21) Key: RCEFMOGVOYEGJN-UHFFFAOYSA-N; InChI=1/C16H13N3O4/c20-15-7-2-1-6-14(15)18-9-8-13(17-16(18)21)11-4-3-5-12(10-11)19(22)23/h1-8,10,20H,9H2,(H,17,21) Key: RCEFMOGVOYEGJN-UHFFFAOYAQ
- SMILES: O=C3N(c1c(O)cccc1)C/C=C(/c2cccc([N+]([O-])=O)c2)N3

Properties
Chemical formula	C_{16}H_{13}N_{3}O_{4}
Molar mass	311.29 g/mol
- Except where otherwise noted, data are given for materials in their standard state (at 25 °C [77 °F], 100 kPa). verify (what is ?) Infobox references

Icilin (AG-3-5) is a synthetic super-agonist of the transient receptor potential M8 (TRPM8) ion channel. Although structurally not related to menthol, it produces an extreme sensation of cold, both in humans and animals. It is almost 200 times more potent than menthol, and 2.5 times more efficacious. Despite their similar effects, icilin activates the TRPM8 receptor in a different way than menthol does. Icilin has been shown to be effective in the treatment of pruritus in an experimental model of itch. It is now used as a research tool for the study of TRP channels, although despite its high potency it is less selective for TRPM8 over other related ion channels than are other compounds such as WS-12.
