= TRPM4 =

Protein-coding gene in the species Homo sapiens

Identifiers
- Aliases: TRPM4, PFHB1B, TRPM4B, LTrpC4, htransient receptor potential cation channel subfamily M member 4, EKVP6
- External IDs: OMIM: 606936; MGI: 1915917; GeneCards: TRPM4

Gene location (Human)
Chr.	Chromosome 19 (human)
Band	19q13.33	Start	49,157,741 bp
Band	19q13.33	End	49,211,836 bp

Gene location (Mouse)
Chr.	Chromosome 7 (mouse)
Band	7|7 B3	Start	44,952,056 bp
Band	7|7 B3	End	44,983,204 bp
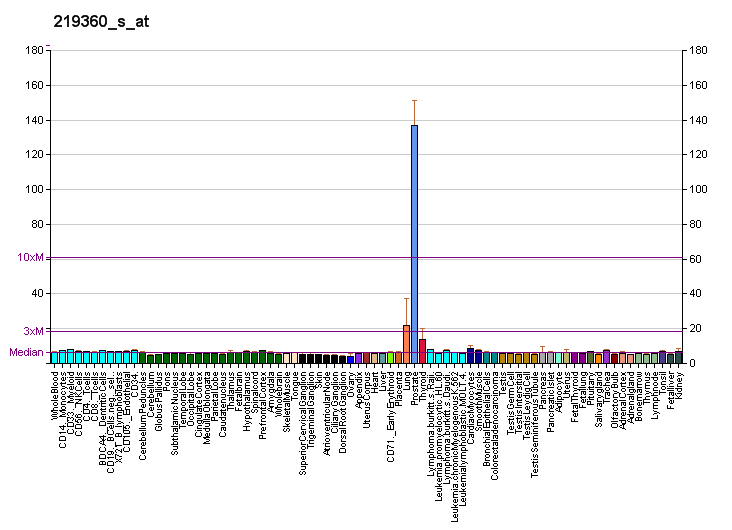
RNA expression pattern
Bgee	Human / Mouse (ortholog); Top expressed in: mucosa of transverse colon; rectum; apex of heart; minor salivary glands; right uterine tube; skin of leg; skin of abdomen; Descending thoracic aorta; gallbladder; left lobe of thyroid gland / Top expressed in: jejunum; duodenum; colon; ileum; vestibular membrane of cochlear duct; lip; left colon; muscle of thigh; stomach; esophagus; More reference expression data
BioGPS	More reference expression data
Gene ontology
Molecular function	nucleotide binding; calcium channel activity; calmodulin binding; ion channel activity; ATP binding; sodium channel activity; calcium activated cation channel activity; calcium ion binding; metal ion binding
Cellular component	integral component of membrane; Golgi apparatus; membrane; plasma membrane; nucleoplasm; endoplasmic reticulum; cytosol; soma; sodium channel complex; spanning component of plasma membrane; spanning component of membrane
Biological process	adaptive immune response; vasoconstriction; immune system process; positive regulation of canonical Wnt signaling pathway; regulation of membrane potential; cation transport; ion transport; protein sumoylation; dendritic cell chemotaxis; regulation of T cell cytokine production; cardiac conduction; positive regulation of cell population proliferation; calcium ion transport; negative regulation of bone mineralization; positive regulation of atrial cardiac muscle cell action potential; positive regulation of heart rate; transmembrane transport; positive regulation of adipose tissue development; positive regulation of cytosolic calcium ion concentration; calcium ion transmembrane transport; positive regulation of fat cell differentiation; positive regulation of insulin secretion involved in cellular response to glucose stimulus; negative regulation of osteoblast differentiation; positive regulation of vasoconstriction; positive regulation of regulation of vascular associated smooth muscle cell membrane depolarization; ion transmembrane transport; calcium-mediated signaling; membrane depolarization during AV node cell action potential; membrane depolarization during Purkinje myocyte cell action potential; membrane depolarization during bundle of His cell action potential; regulation of heart rate by cardiac conduction; sodium ion import across plasma membrane; regulation of ventricular cardiac muscle cell action potential; protein homotetramerization; cellular response to ATP; inorganic cation transmembrane transport
Sources:Amigo / QuickGO
Orthologs
Databases	NCBI: entry; OMA: entry
Species	Human	Mouse
Entrez	54795	68667
Ensembl	ENSG00000130529	ENSMUSG00000038260
UniProt	Q8TD43	Q7TN37
RefSeq (mRNA)	NM_001195227; NM_017636; NM_001321281; NM_001321282; NM_001321283 NM_001321285	NM_175130
RefSeq (protein)	NP_001182156; NP_001308210; NP_001308211; NP_001308212; NP_001308214 NP_060106	NP_780339
Location (UCSC)	Chr 19: 49.16 – 49.21 Mb	Chr 7: 44.95 – 44.98 Mb
PubMed search
- Wikidata
View/Edit Human	View/Edit Mouse

Transient receptor potential cation channel subfamily M member 4 (hTRPM4), also known as melastatin-4, is a protein complex that in humans is encoded by the TRPM4 gene.

== TRPM4 Channel Blocker ==
- 9-Phenanthrol
- TRPM4-IN-5

== See also ==
- TRPM
