= Clinopodium fasciculatum =

Conservation status
- Least Concern (IUCN 3.1)

Scientific classification
- Kingdom: Plantae
- Clade: Tracheophytes
- Clade: Angiosperms
- Clade: Eudicots
- Clade: Asterids
- Order: Lamiales
- Family: Lamiaceae
- Genus: Clinopodium
- Species: C. fasciculatum

Binomial name
- Clinopodium fasciculatum (Benth.) Harley

Species of flowering plant

Clinopodium fasciculatum is a species of flowering plant in the family Lamiaceae. It is found only in Ecuador. Its natural habitats are subtropical or tropical moist montane forests and subtropical or tropical high-elevation shrubland.
