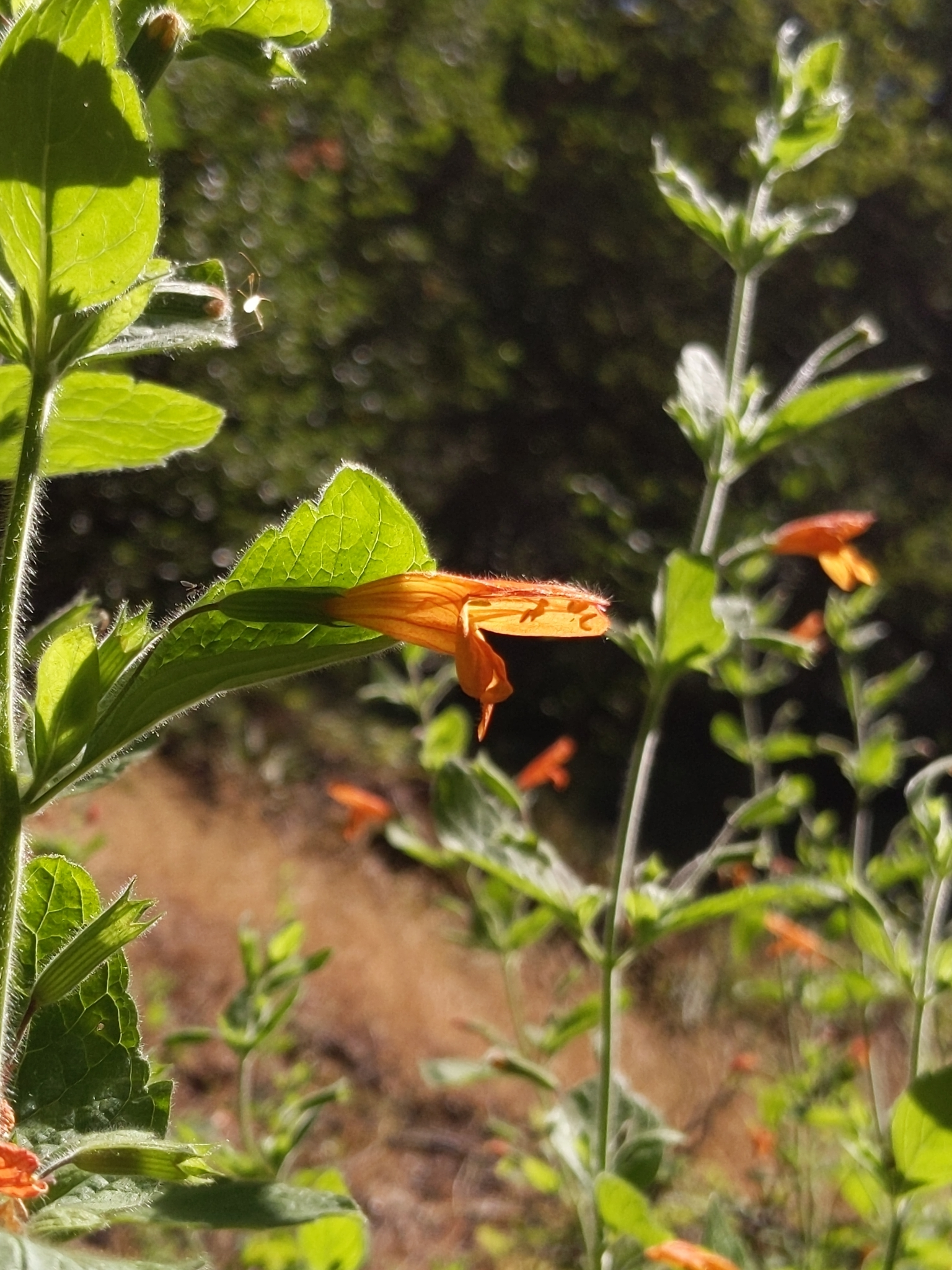
- Monterey County, California, 2019

Scientific classification
- Kingdom: Plantae
- Clade: Tracheophytes
- Clade: Angiosperms
- Clade: Eudicots
- Clade: Asterids
- Order: Lamiales
- Family: Lamiaceae
- Genus: Clinopodium
- Species: C. mimuloides

Binomial name
- Clinopodium mimuloides (Benth.) Kuntze

Synonyms
- Satureja mimuloides

= Clinopodium mimuloides =

Species of flowering plant

Clinopodium mimuloides is a species of flowering plant in the mint family known by the common name monkeyflower savory. It is endemic to California.

The plant can be found from the Santa Lucia Mountains to the San Gabriel Mountains in Central California and Southern California. It grows in chaparral, and woodlands, and moist places.

== Description ==
Clinopodium mimuloides is a perennial herb or small shrub growing erect to about 2 metres (6.6 ft) in height. The slender branches are hairy, the herbage aromatic. The leaves have toothed or wavy edges and are up to 8 centimeters long by 6 wide.

Flowers occur in the leaf axils. Each is tubular and may be over 3 centimeters long. The flowers are salmon pink in color, and as the plant's name suggests, resemble those of some Mimulus species.
