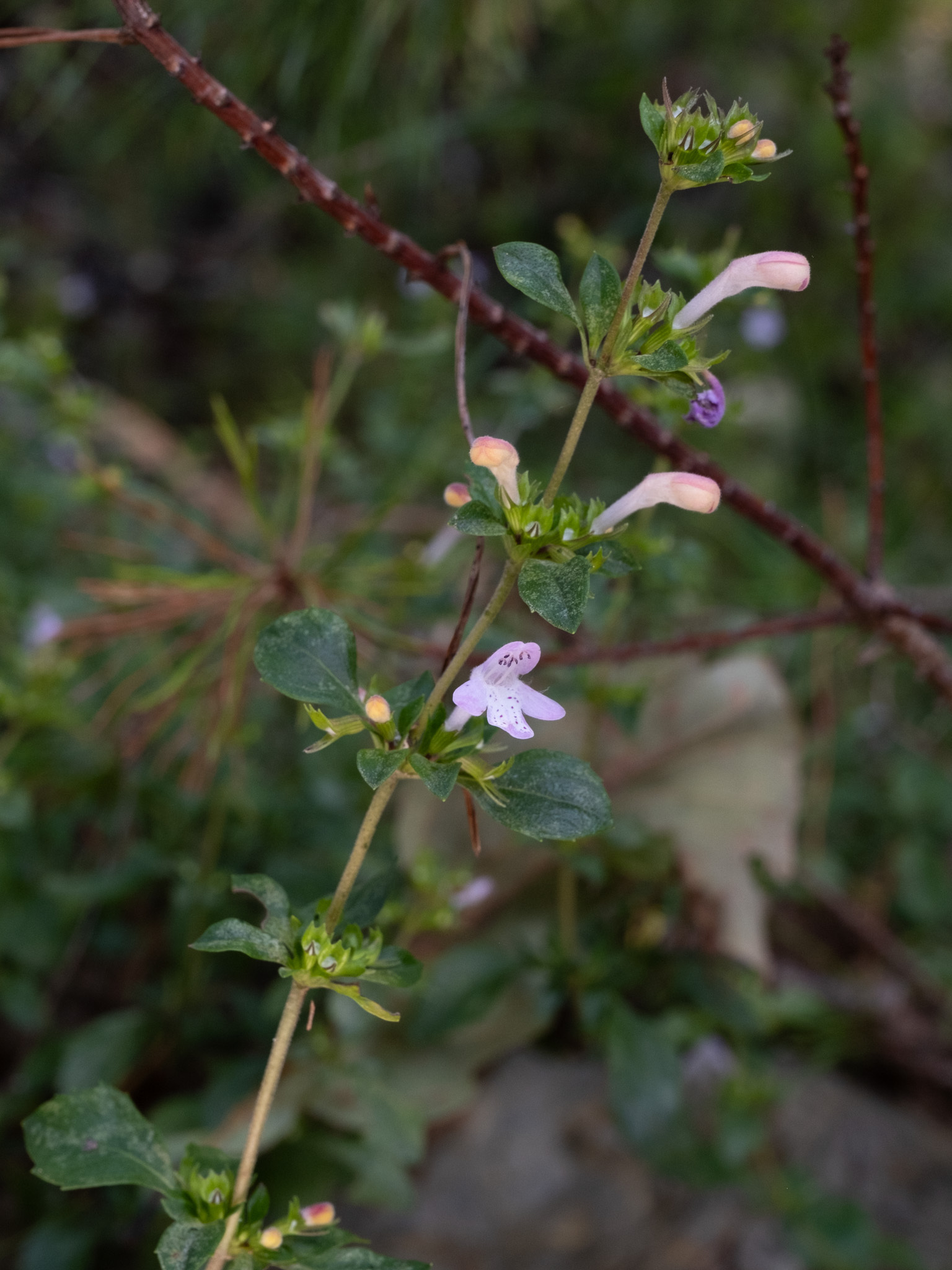

Conservation status
- Imperiled (NatureServe)

Scientific classification
- Kingdom: Plantae
- Clade: Tracheophytes
- Clade: Angiosperms
- Clade: Eudicots
- Clade: Asterids
- Order: Lamiales
- Family: Lamiaceae
- Genus: Clinopodium
- Species: C. talladeganum

Binomial name
- Clinopodium talladeganum B.R. Keener & Floden

= Clinopodium talladeganum =

Species of flowering plant

Clinopodium talladeganum, commonly known as the Talladega wild basil, is a perennial vascular shrub in the mint family. C. talladeganum is endemic to a small area in three counties of Alabama.

== Description ==
Clinopodium talladeganum is about twelve to eighteen inches tall. The stems are woody and pubescent. Within the first year, the pubescence spreads to curved hairs, while within the second year, the bark starts to peel, and by the third year, it becomes glabrous. When the bark peels, the nodes are bearded sometimes, and the distances between the nodes, the internodes, is around 8-25mm. The leaves are pubescent, petiolate, and opposite with 1-6 mm petioles; the base is cuneate, while the apex is acute. The inflorescence of Clinopodium talladeganum is in axillary glomerules, which have 2-20 nodes, 2-8 flowered, the pedicels are 1.5-2 mm, and it is very pubescent. The flowers are pale lavender in late summer, occurring in 3-9 cymes. The flowers have a calyx that is around 4-5 mm long and tubular, green and purple, and it is pubescent on the ribs and along the margin, where the trichomes are erect. The fruit of this wild basil is mericarp and dark brown.

== Habitat ==
Clinopodium talladeganum can live within alluvium substrates; specifically, it can live in sparsely wooded, dry rocky, or sandy alluvium substrates and upland alluvium substrates. It can grow in xeric pine woodlands, rocky woodlands, and rock outcrops.

== Conservation ==
Only endemic to three counties in Alabama, the Clinopodium talladeganum is confined within the Talladega Mountains—only a few confirmed subpopulations of about a dozen. Clinopodium talladeganum is imperiled and is considered vulnerable within the IUCN status.

To fully understand the distribution and population of Clinopodium talladeganum, further research, and understanding of the available habitat and its subpopulation sizes should be considered, as well as the ecology of the Talladega wild Basil to fully record the occurrence of this new species of Clinopodium.

Because this population has a narrow distribution, regular monitoring should continue to document threats, habitat, site conditions, and other factors that could contribute to the overall population size A known potential threat to Clinopodium talladeganum is fire suppression. Because Clinopodium talladegenum is only within a small boundary, a fire could damage the small population size.
