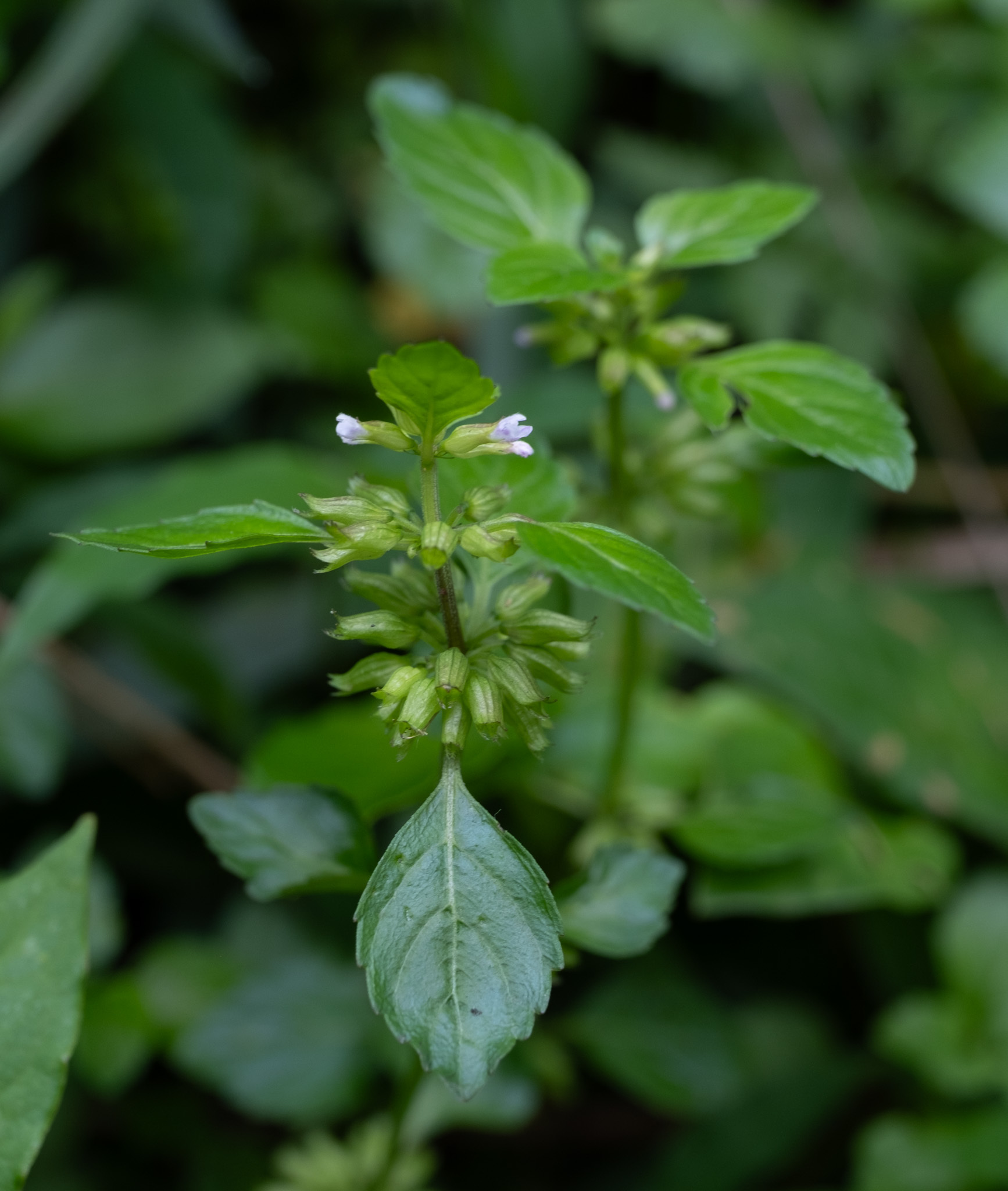

Scientific classification
- Kingdom: Plantae
- Clade: Tracheophytes
- Clade: Angiosperms
- Clade: Eudicots
- Clade: Asterids
- Order: Lamiales
- Family: Lamiaceae
- Genus: Clinopodium
- Species: C. gracile

Binomial name
- Clinopodium gracile (Benth.) Kuntze

= Clinopodium gracile =

Species of plant in the mint family

Clinopodium gracile, commonly known as calamint, savory, slender wild basil, and tower flower, is a plant species in the mint family (Lamiaceae) native to Asia.

== Description ==
Small perennial herb, slender, stoloniferous; Stem quadrangular, numerous, tufted, erect or procumbent at the base, ascending, 8–30 cm, retrorse, pubescent; Leaves opposite, basal leaves circular-ovate, 1.2–1.5 × 1–1.1 cm, base rounded, apex obtuse, margin remotely crenate, lower and mid stem leaves ovate, 1.5–2.5 × 1–1.5 cm, papery, sub-glabrous, abaxially sparsely hispid on veins, apex obtuse, base rounded to cuneate, margin remotely dentate or crenate-serrate, petioles 0.3–1 cm; Inflorescence verticillaster, few flowered (5–10), lax or dense, crowded in short terminal raceme, floral leaves ovate-lanceolate, 0.5–1 × 0.3–0.8 cm, margin serrate, acute; Bract linear, acute, puberulous, much shorter than pedicel; Flower rose-pink, 5–7 × 3–4 mm, pedicel 1–3mm; Calyx tubular, base rounded, ca. 3–5 mm and declinate in fruit, puberulent or subglabrous, minutely hispid on veins, throat sparsely fine pilose, teeth ciliate, lower two subulate, upper three triangular, reflexed in fruit; Corolla ca. 4.5 mm, puberulent; nutlets ovoid, smooth 0.4–0.5 mm. Flowering occurs June through August, and fruiting occurs August through October.

== Distribution and habitat ==
Clinopodium gracile is native to Asia and can occur China, Indonesia, Japan, Java, Korea, Laos, Malaysia, Myanmar, Taiwan, Thailand, Vietnam, and India (Arunachal Pradesh, Assam, Manipur, Meghalaya, Mizoram, Nagaland, Sikkim, & Tripura). It has also been introduced to parts of the Southeastern United States. It commonly flourishes near river banks, wild/semi-wild areas, and alongside forest margin sites.

== Synonymy ==
=== Homotypic synonyms ===
- Calamintha gracilis Benth. in A.P.de Candolle, Prodr. 12: 232 (1848)
- Satureja gracilis (Benth.) Nakai in J. Coll. Sci. Imp. Univ. Tokyo 31: 149 (1911)

=== Heterotypic synonyms ===
- Calamintha argyi H.Lév. in Repert. Spec. Nov. Regni Veg. 8: 423 (1910)
- Calamintha confinis Hance in J. Bot. 6: 331 (1868)
- Calamintha moluccana Miq. in Fl. Ned. Ind. 2: 968 (1859)
- Calamintha radicans Vaniot in Bull. Acad. Int. Géogr. Bot., sér. 3, 14: 182 (1904)
- Clinopodium confine (Hance) Kuntze in Revis. Gen. Pl. 2: 515 (1891)
- Clinopodium confine var. globosum C.Y.Wu & S.J.Hsuan ex H.W.Li in Acta Phytotax. Sin. 12: 223 (1974)
- Satureja confinis (Hance) Kudô in Mem. Fac. Sci. Taihoku Imp. Univ. 2: 100 (1929)

== Gallery ==
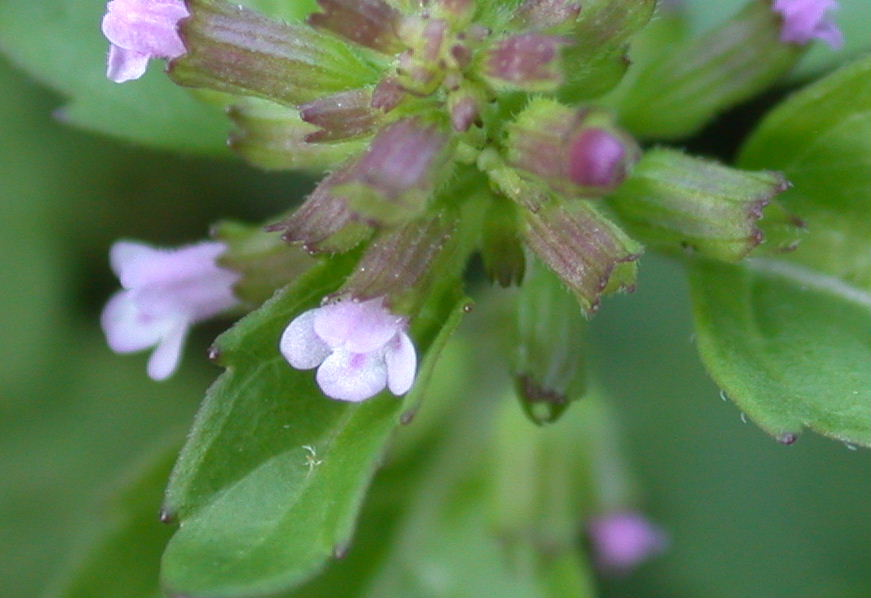
Flower close up

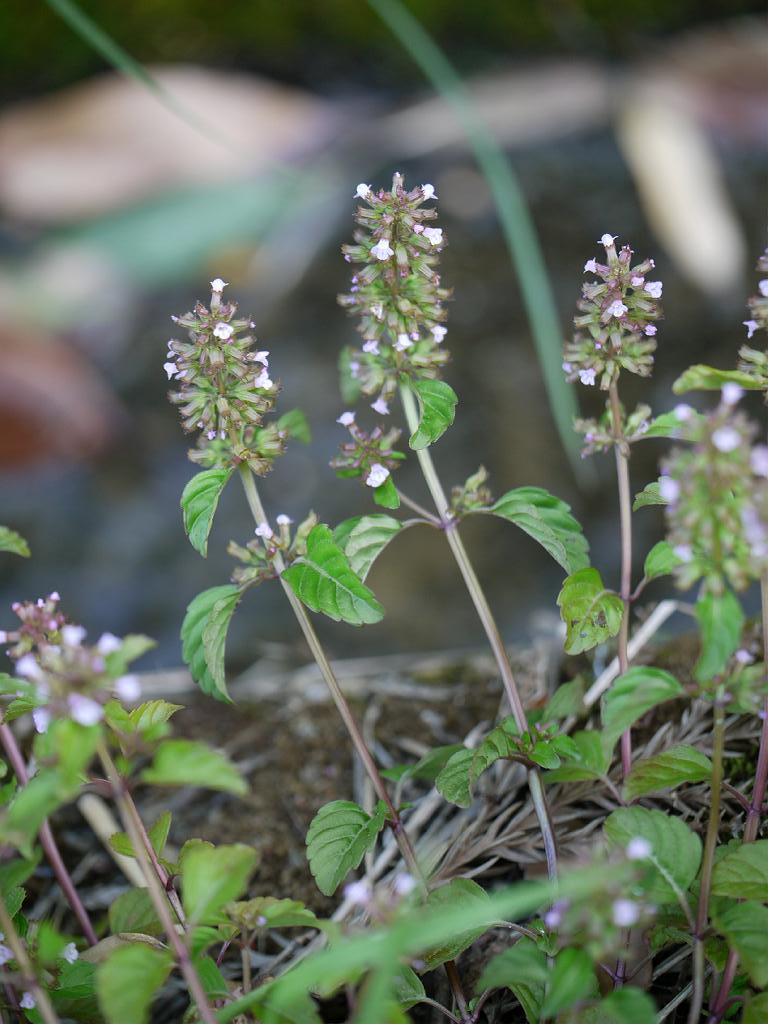
Inflorescences

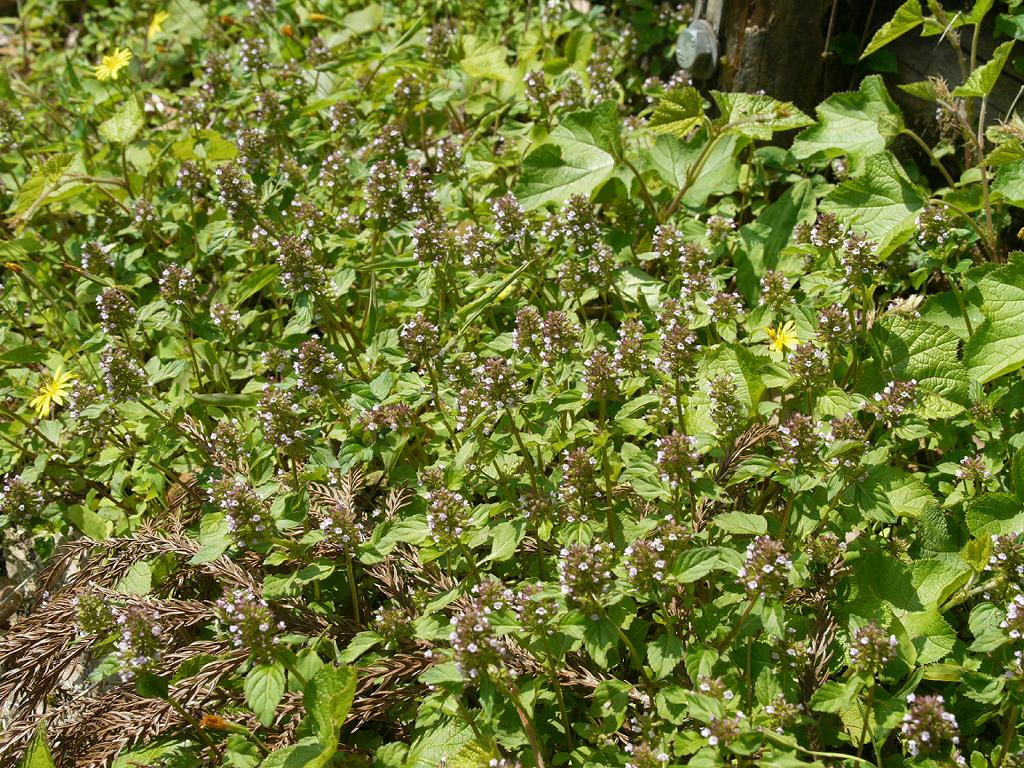
Habit

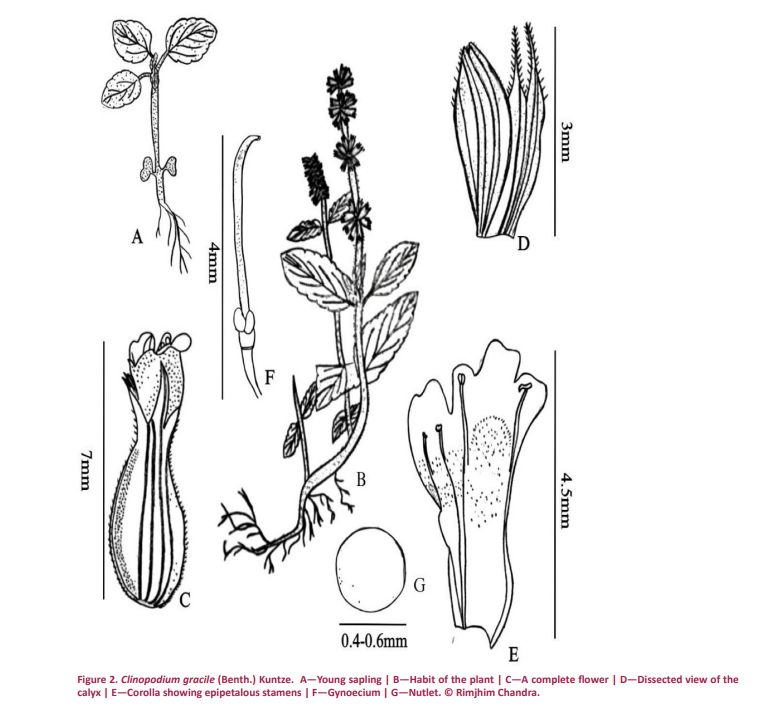
Botanical illustration
