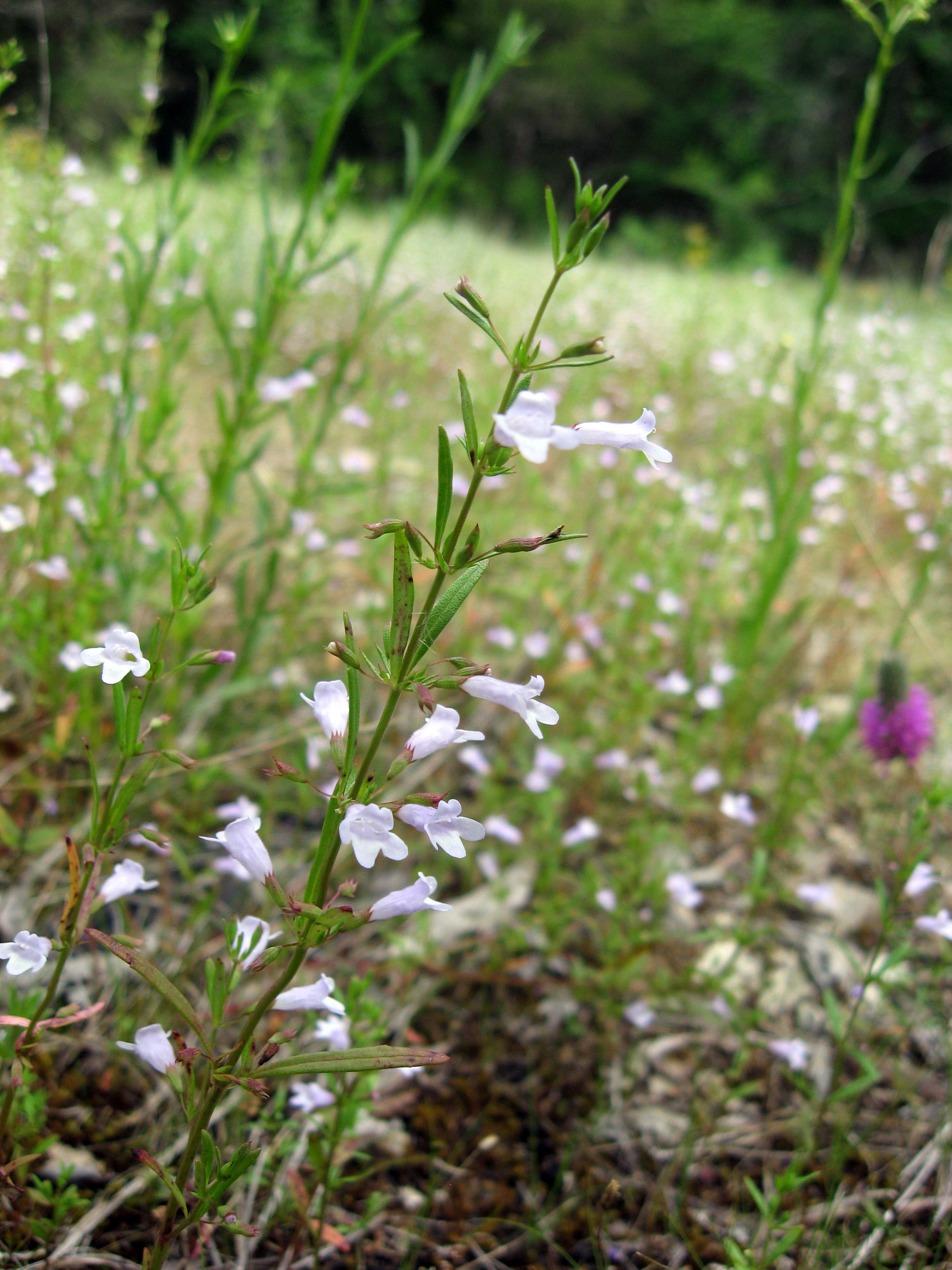

Conservation status
- Vulnerable (NatureServe)

Scientific classification
- Kingdom: Plantae
- Clade: Tracheophytes
- Clade: Angiosperms
- Clade: Eudicots
- Clade: Asterids
- Order: Lamiales
- Family: Lamiaceae
- Genus: Clinopodium
- Species: C. glabellum

Binomial name
- Clinopodium glabellum (Michx.) Kunze

= Clinopodium glabellum =

Species of flowering plant

Clinopodium glabellum is a species of flowering plant in the mint family. It is commonly known as glade calamint, glade savory, and glade wild basil. It is native to the Nashville Basin of Tennessee, the Bluegrass Region of Kentucky, and two counties in Alabama. Within this range, it is found only on wet cedar glades and in seeps along limestone creekbeds. Due to its narrow range and specific habitat requirements, this species is considered vulnerable.

It is a small perennial, often flowering in the first year. It produces pale pink flowers in late spring.

Clinopodium glabellum has been confused with Clinopodium arkansanum, which has caused the known range of both species be somewhat unclear. Clinopodium glabellum has sometimes been called "Ozark calamint", which is misleading as the Ozark populations appear to be Clinopodium arkansanum.
