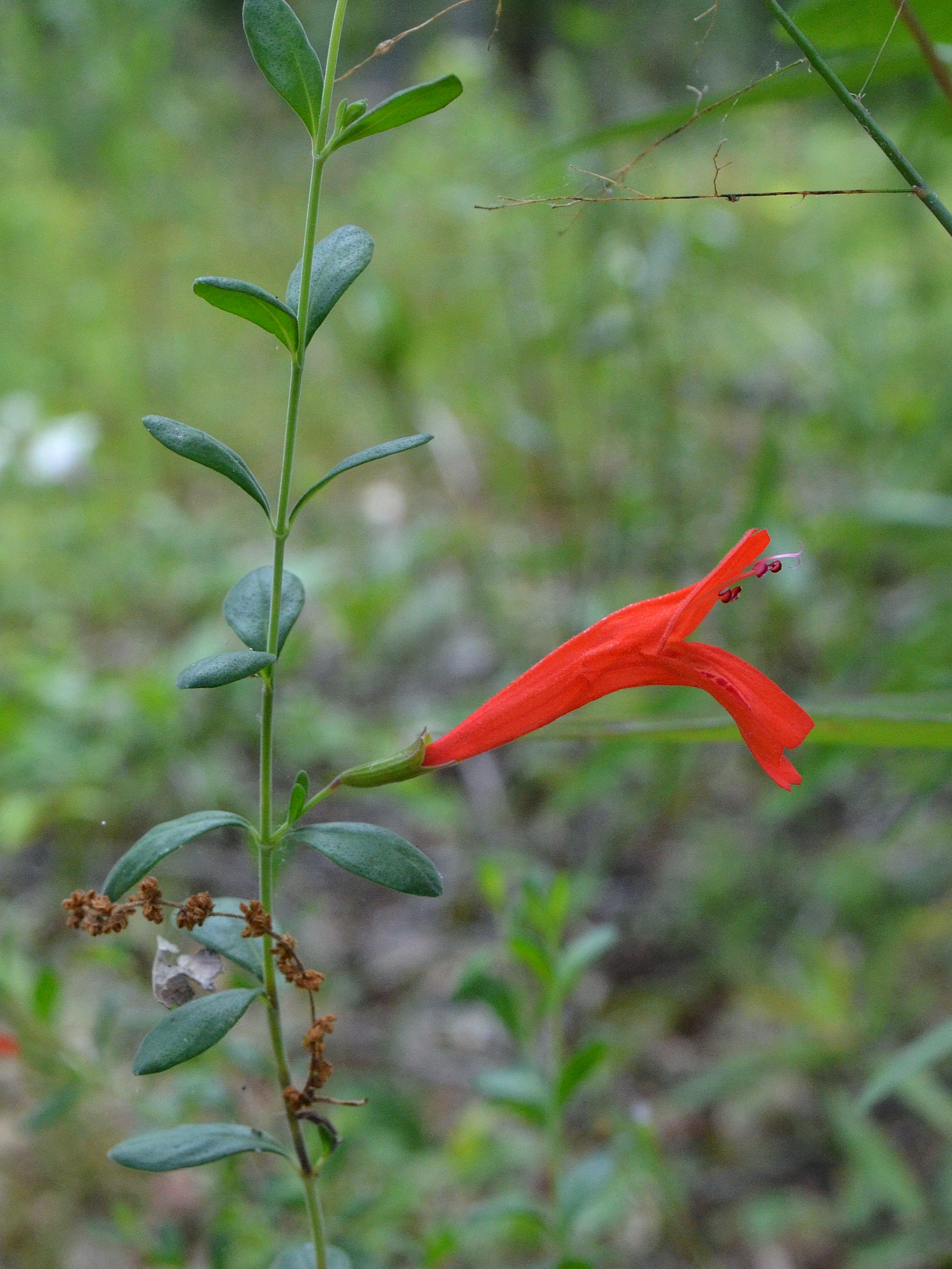

Scientific classification
- Kingdom: Plantae
- Clade: Tracheophytes
- Clade: Angiosperms
- Clade: Eudicots
- Clade: Asterids
- Order: Lamiales
- Family: Lamiaceae
- Genus: Clinopodium
- Species: C. coccineum

Binomial name
- Clinopodium coccineum (Nutt. ex Hook.) Kuntze

Synonyms
- Calamintha coccinea; Clinopodium macrocalyx; Cunila coccinea; Melissa coccinea; Rafinesquia coccinea; Satureja coccinea; Satureja macrocalyx

= Clinopodium coccineum =

Species of flowering plant

Clinopodium coccineum, commonly known as scarlet calamint or red basil, is a evergreen perennial plant of the family Lamiaceae.

It is indigenous to the coastal areas of south-eastern United States and is found in Alabama, Florida, Georgia, and Mississippi. C. coccineum is a woody perennial, which grows to a height of 12–35 in (30–90 cm). It produces reddish-orange tubular labiate flowers. It has simple obovate leaves, with dentate margins. The leaves have a glandular (downy) surface and are opposite.
