= Clinopodium troodi =

Scientific classification
- Kingdom: Plantae
- Clade: Tracheophytes
- Clade: Angiosperms
- Clade: Eudicots
- Clade: Asterids
- Order: Lamiales
- Family: Lamiaceae
- Genus: Clinopodium
- Species: C. troodi

Binomial name
- Clinopodium troodi (Post) Govaerts

Synonyms
- Acinos troodi (Post) Leblebici; Calamintha troodi Post; Satureja troodi (Post) Holmboe; Ziziphora troodi (Post) Melnikov

Species of flowering plant

Clinopodium troodi, the Troödos rock thyme, is a perennial sprawling herb with a woody rootstock and reddish-green 5–20 cm long hairy shoots. This aromatic member of the mint family is prized for its violet-blue flowers that bloom amid the rugged mountain landscape. Found exclusively in the highest elevations of the Troodos Mountains of Cyprus, this plant has evolved to grow in harsh rocky environments where few other plants can survive.

== Description ==
Clinopodium troodi is a perennial herb that grows from a woody base (rootstock). Its stems trail or rise slightly (decumbent to procumbent stems) and measure 2.5–35 cm in length. The stems bear both glandular secretions and fine hairs that range from very short and soft (puberulent) to longer and spreading (patent-haired), each hair 0.1–0.8 mm long. Leaves sit in opposite pairs and vary from broadly egg-shaped (broadly ovate) to nearly round with tapered ends (orbiculate-lanceolate), about 3–11 mm long and 3–9 mm wide. Each leaf is carried on a small stalk (petiole 1.5–9 mm long), has smooth edges (entire margins) or shallow, tooth-like notches near the tip (shallowly serrate margins), and is sparsely curled-haired (crispate-haired) with many tiny glands. Flowers are arranged in tight ringed clusters around the stem (verticillasters), with each ring (whorl) bearing 2–10 flowers. Each bloom is enclosed by a two-lipped cup (calyx, sub-bilabiate) 7–10.5 mm long, divided into five small lobes (teeth) and fringed with glandular hairs (ciliate). The petals form a two-lipped tube (corolla, bilabiate) 12–21 mm long, coloured yellowish-violet to pale bluish-violet, which sticks well beyond the calyx; its lower lip is longer than the upper. After flowering it produces four small dry fruits (nutlets) that are brown and egg-shaped with three flat sides (obovoid-trigonous), each about 1.8–2 × 0.7–1 mm.

== Subspecies ==
Two subspecies are recognised on the basis of stem length, hair-length and verticillaster spacing:

- Clinopodium troodi subsp. vardaranum (Leblebici) Govaerts – flowering stems 2.5–16 cm; indumentum ≤ 0.1 mm; verticillasters 1–4, spaced ≤ 2 cm apart.
- Clinopodium troodi subsp. grandiflorum (Hartvig & Å.Strid) Govaerts – stems 4–35 cm; hairs 0.1–0.8 mm; verticillasters (1–)2–6, spaced up to 5.8 cm apart.

== Habitat and distribution ==
Both subspecies grow on rocky slopes—primarily on serpentine soil and, for subsp. grandiflorum, also on limestone—at high elevations (1700–2200 m). They occur in south-west Anatolia (Muğla and Denizli provinces) as eastern Mediterranean montane endemics and are listed as endangered species in the Turkish Red Data Book. The nominate subspecies is Endemic to Cyprus where it is confined to the highest peaks of the Troödos Mountains, mainly around Khionistra, where it is locally common.
