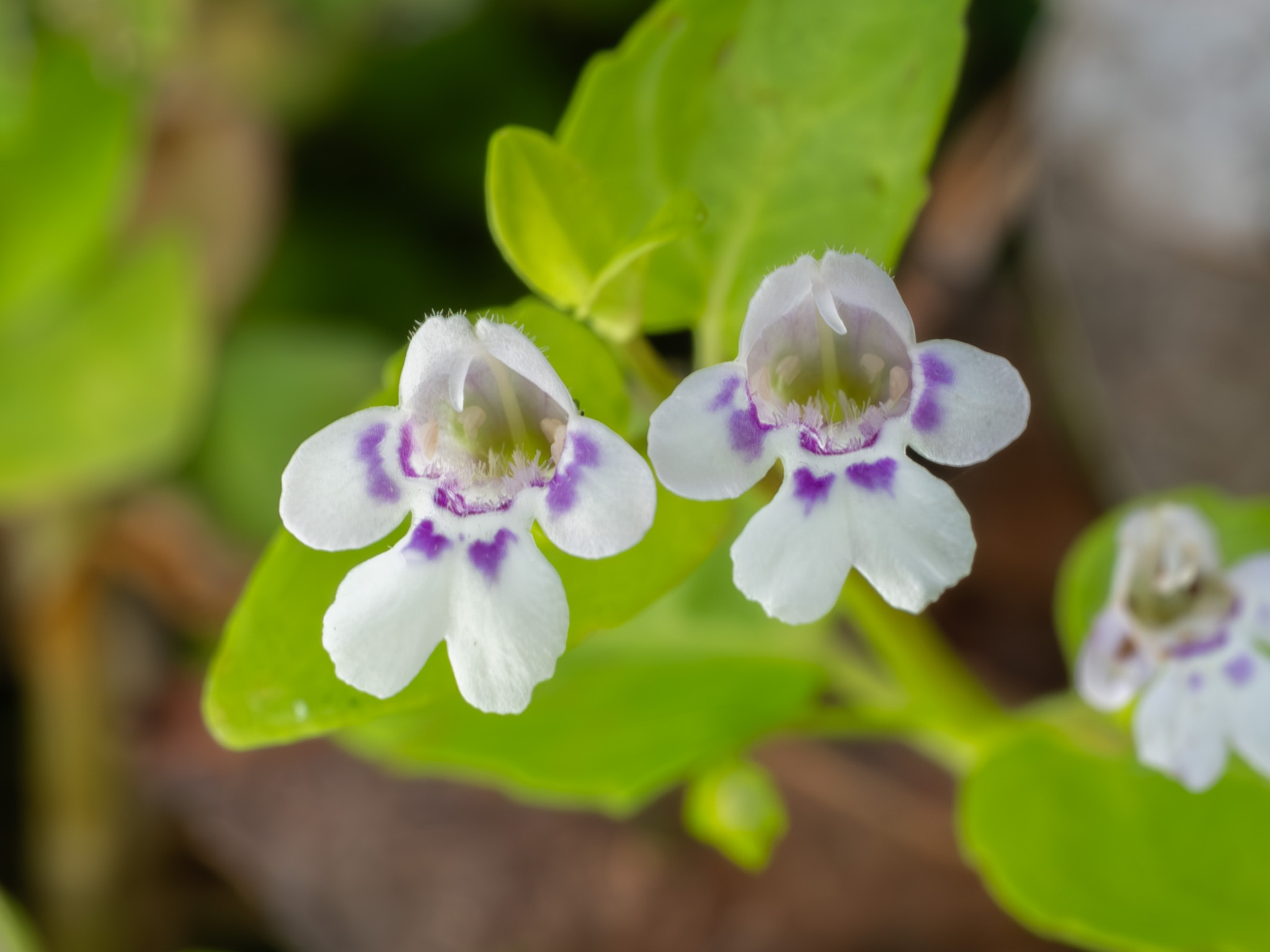

Conservation status
- Secure (NatureServe)

Scientific classification
- Kingdom: Plantae
- Clade: Tracheophytes
- Clade: Angiosperms
- Clade: Eudicots
- Clade: Asterids
- Order: Lamiales
- Family: Lamiaceae
- Genus: Clinopodium
- Species: C. brownei

Binomial name
- Clinopodium brownei (Sw.) Kuntze

Synonyms
- Satureja brownei (Sw.) Briq.; Micromeria pilosiuscula (Gray) Small; M. brownei (Sw.) Benth.; Micromeria brownei (Sw.) Benth. var. pilosiuscula Gray

= Clinopodium brownei =

Browne's savory

Species of flowering plant

Clinopodium brownei, or Browne's savory, is a perennial with sprawling square stems and opposite leaves. This herb is heavily pubescent on the stem and inner and outer calyx. The corolla is bilabiate. The lips are thin and delicate and may contain hairs. The corolla color is pinkish-white to lavender and sometimes white. There are four stamens which are didynamous and epipetalis. The ovary is 4 lobed with a gynobasic style with acute apices. Under the ovary appears to be a nectiferous gland. This herb is found during late winter and early spring in marshy environments along the coastal plain of the southeastern United States, specifically from Texas through South Carolina, as well as in Mexico, Central America, South America and the West Indies.
