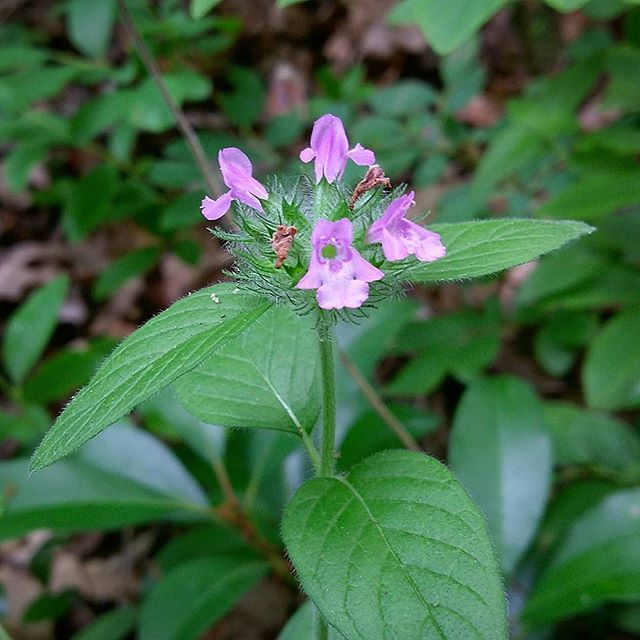

Conservation status
- Secure (NatureServe)

Scientific classification
- Kingdom: Plantae
- Clade: Tracheophytes
- Clade: Angiosperms
- Clade: Eudicots
- Clade: Asterids
- Order: Lamiales
- Family: Lamiaceae
- Genus: Clinopodium
- Species: C. vulgare

Binomial name
- Clinopodium vulgare L., 1753

Subspecies
- C. vulgare subsp. arundanum (Boiss.) Nyman; C. vulgare subsp. orientale Bothmer; C. vulgare subsp. vulgare

Synonyms
- List: Acinos vulgaris (L.) Pers. (1806); Calamintha clinopodium (Vest) Spenn. (1835); Calamintha vulgaris (L.) Druce (1906); Clinopodium clinopodium (Vest) Degen (1905); Faucibarba clinopodium (Vest) Dulac (1867); Melissa clinopodium (Vest) Benth. (1834); Melissa vulgaris (L.) Trevis. (1842); Satureja clinopodium (Vest) Caruel (1884); Satureja vulgaris (L.) Fritsch (1897); Thymus clinopodium Vest (1805)

= Clinopodium vulgare =

Species of plant in the mint family

Clinopodium vulgare, or the wild basil (not to be confused with the basils of the genus Ocimum), is a species of flowering plant in the family Lamiaceae.

== Description ==
Wild basil is a perennial rhizomatous herb with square, upright, hairy stems and opposite pairs of leaves. The leaves are hairy, ovate or lanceolate in shape, and have short or no stalks, wedge-shaped bases and bluntly-toothed margins. The inflorescence is a terminal spike consisting of several loose whorls of clusters of flowers growing in the axils of the leaves. Each flower has a short stalk, five sepals about 10 mm (0.39 in) long and five petals 12 to 15 mm (0.47 to 0.59 in) in length which are fused into a tube. The flowers are pink, violet or purple and have two lips. Each has four stamens, a long style and fused carpels.

== Distribution ==
Wild basil occurs in suitable locations in most of Europe, western and central Asia, North America and North Africa. Its typical habitat is dry grassland and heathland, usually on limestone or chalky soils. Though its distribution is patchy it is widespread and not threatened in the UK.

== Uses ==
The leaves of wild basil are used as an aromatic herb in the preparation of food dishes and to make a herbal tea. They can also be used in the preparation of both a brown and a yellow dye.

This plant has traditionally been used as an astringent, a cardiac stimulant, an expectorant, to reduce flatulence and to increase perspiration. It has been used traditionally in Bulgaria for the healing of wounds and has been shown to have anti-bacterial properties.

== Ecology ==
Pollination is by bees and Lepidoptera.
