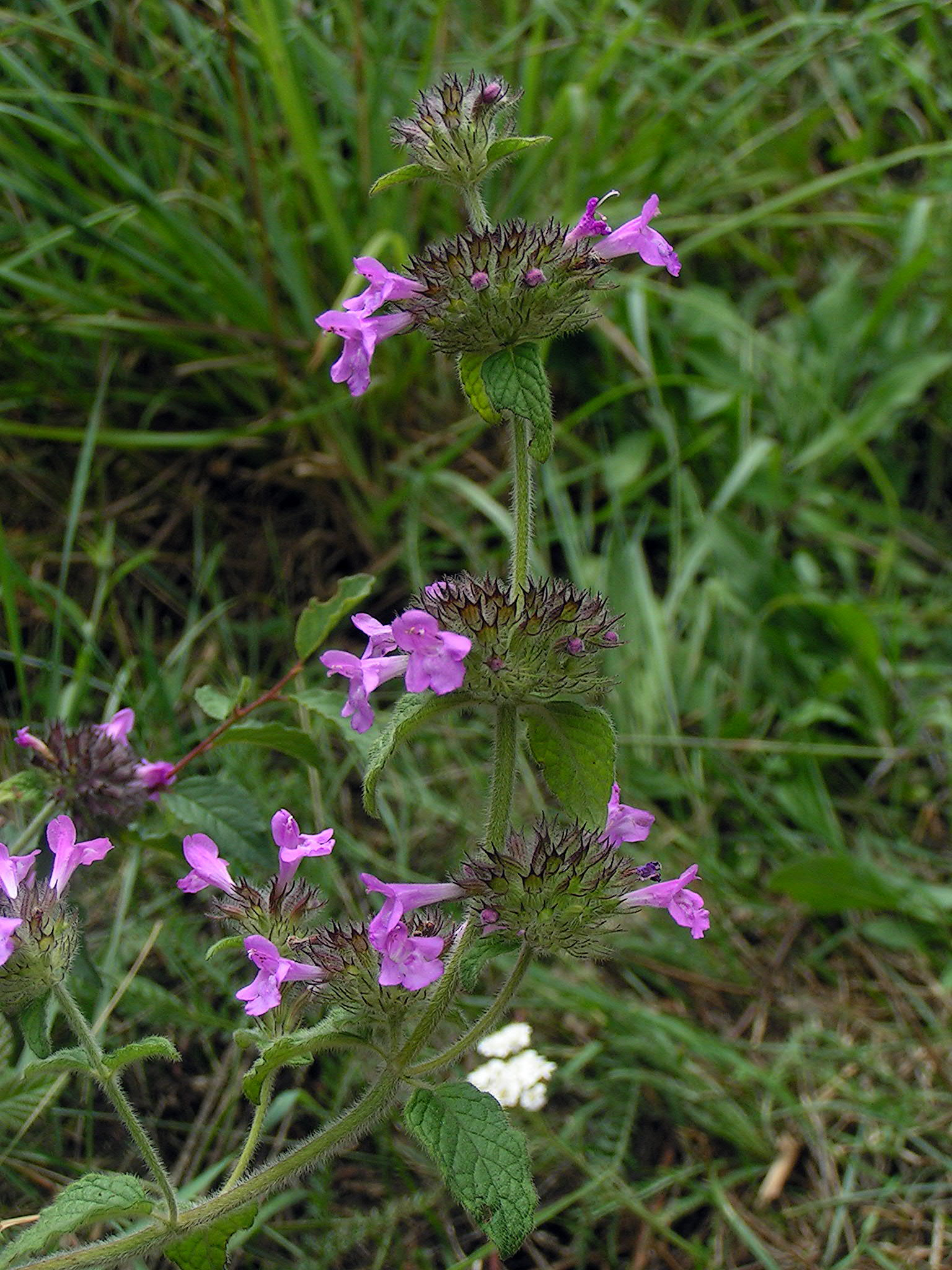
- Clinopodium vulgare

Scientific classification
- Kingdom: Plantae
- Clade: Tracheophytes
- Clade: Angiosperms
- Clade: Eudicots
- Clade: Asterids
- Order: Lamiales
- Family: Lamiaceae
- Subfamily: Nepetoideae
- Tribe: Mentheae
- Genus: Clinopodium; L.

Type species
- Clinopodium vulgare L.

Species
- See text

Synonyms
- Acinos Mill.; Antonina Vved.; Bancroftia R.K.Porter; Calamintha Mill.; × Calapodium Holub; Ceratominthe Briq.; Diodeilis Raf.; Drymosiphon Melnikov; Faucibarba Dulac; Gardoquia Ruiz & Pav.; Nostelis Raf.; Oreosphacus Phil.; Rafinesquia Raf.; Rizoa Cav.; Xenopoma Willd.

= Clinopodium =

Genus of flowering plants

Clinopodium is a genus of flowering plants in the family Lamiaceae, in the subtribe Menthinae. Clinopodium belongs to a large and complex group of genera including many New World mints such as Hedeoma, Monarda, and Pycnanthemum, and this group is in turn a sister clade to Mentha. The genus name Clinopodium is derived from the Latin clinopodion, from the Ancient Greek κλινοπόδιον (klinopódion), from κλίνη (klínē) "bed" and πόδιον (pódion) "little foot". These were names for Clinopodium vulgare. They allude to the form of the calyx.

Clinopodium species are used as food plants by the larvae of some Lepidoptera species including Coleophora albitarsella.

Various Clinopodium species are used as medicinal herbs. For example, C. macrostemum is used in Mexico as a tea under the name poleo or yerba de borracho to cure hangovers, stomach aches, and liver disease.

== Taxonomy ==
Clinopodium has been defined very differently by different authors. Some have restricted it to as few as 13 species, all closely related to the type species, Clinopodium vulgare. In the latest revision of Lamiaceae, Clinopodium encompassed about 100 species, including those otherwise placed in the genera Acinos, Calamintha, Micromeria, Satureja, and Xenopoma. This circumscription, called Clinopodium sensu lato, was shown to be polyphyletic in 2004, with additional information on the issue published in 2010. As currently defined, Clinopodium includes both a core clade of this genus that includes the type species and a sister clade that is a broad assemblage of New World species designated Clinopodium alongside species included in 22 other genera. This "Clinopodium complex" will need a systematic taxonomic and nomenclatural review before valid names can be designated.

== Selected species ==
The genus Clinopodium is considered polyphyletic by modern authors. The cladistic classification below follows the clades outlined in Brauchler, et al (2010) with additional species data from Drew, et al (2017). New World species of Clinopodium that have not been sequenced are assumed to be part of the "New World group".

=== Clinopodium sensu stricto ===
- Clinopodium chinense (Benth.) Kuntze
- Clinopodium gracile (Benth.) Kuntze – slender wild basil
- Clinopodium menthifolium (Host) Stace – woodland calamint
- Clinopodium nepeta (L.) Kuntze – lesser calamint
- Clinopodium serpyllifolium (M.Bieb.) Kuntze
- Clinopodium umbrosum (M.Bieb.) K.Koch
- Clinopodium vulgare (L.) – wild basil (type species)

=== Clinopodium sensu lato ===
==== Clinopodium abyssinicum group ====
- Clinopodium abyssinicum (Benth.) Kuntze

==== Clinopodium acinos group ====
Allied to Ziziphora.

- Clinopodium acinos (L.) Kuntze
- Clinopodium alpinum (L.) Kuntze
- Clinopodium troodi (Post) Govaerts

==== Clinopodium nepalense group ====
- Clinopodium nepalense (Kitam. & Murata) Bräuchler & Heubl

==== Clinopodium simense group ====
- Clinopodium simense (Benth.) Kuntze

==== New World group ====
Polyphyletic assemblage of New World species assigned to Clinopodium intermixed with species from 22 other named genera (including Conradina, Minthostachys, Monardella, etc).

- Clinopodium ashei (Weath.) Small – Ashe's calamint
- Clinopodium bolivianum (Benth.) Kuntze
- Clinopodium brownei (Sw.) Kuntze – Browne's savory
- Clinopodium chandleri (Brandegee) P.D.Cantino & Wagstaff – San Miguel calamint
- Clinopodium chilense (Benth.) Govaerts
- Clinopodium coccineum (Nutt. ex Hook.) Kuntze – scarlet calamint
- Clinopodium dentatum (Chapm.) Kuntze – Florida calamint
- Clinopodium douglasii (Benth.) Kuntze – yerba buena, Oregon tea
- Clinopodium fasciculatum (Benth.) Harley
- Clinopodium glabellum (Michx.) Kuntze – Ozark calamint
- Clinopodium macrostemum (Moc. & Sessé et Benth) Kuntze
- Clinopodium mimuloides (Benth.) Kuntze – monkeyflower savory
- Clinopodium mutabile (Epling) Harley
- Clinopodium talladeganum B.R. Keener & Floden – Talladega calamint
- Clinopodium vimineum (L.) Kuntze – serpentine savory
- Clinopodium kewensis R. CHANDRA, Ö. GÜNER & Ö. ÇETİN; Trailing wild basil

==== Unclear affiliation ====
- Clinopodium grandiflorum (L.) Kuntze
- Clinopodium hakkaricum Dirmenci & Firat – Hakkari clinopodium

== Gallery ==
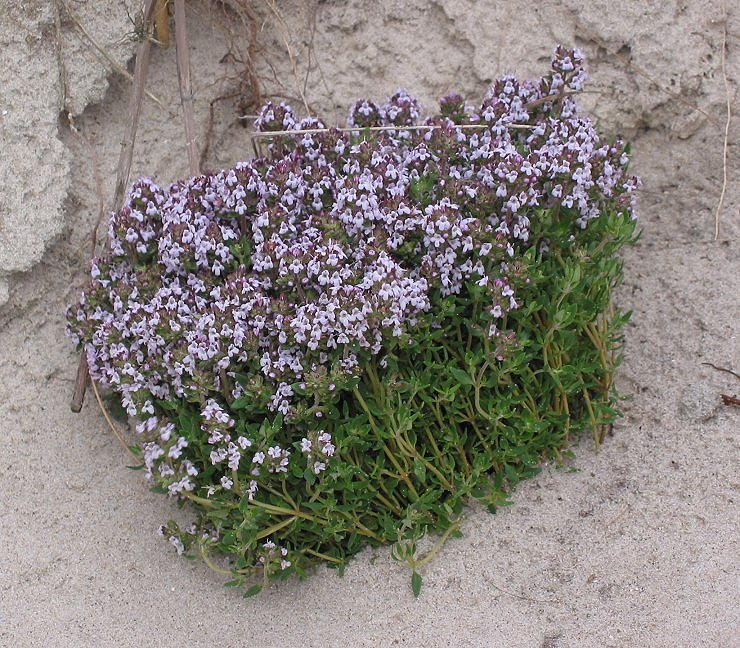
Clinopodium acinos

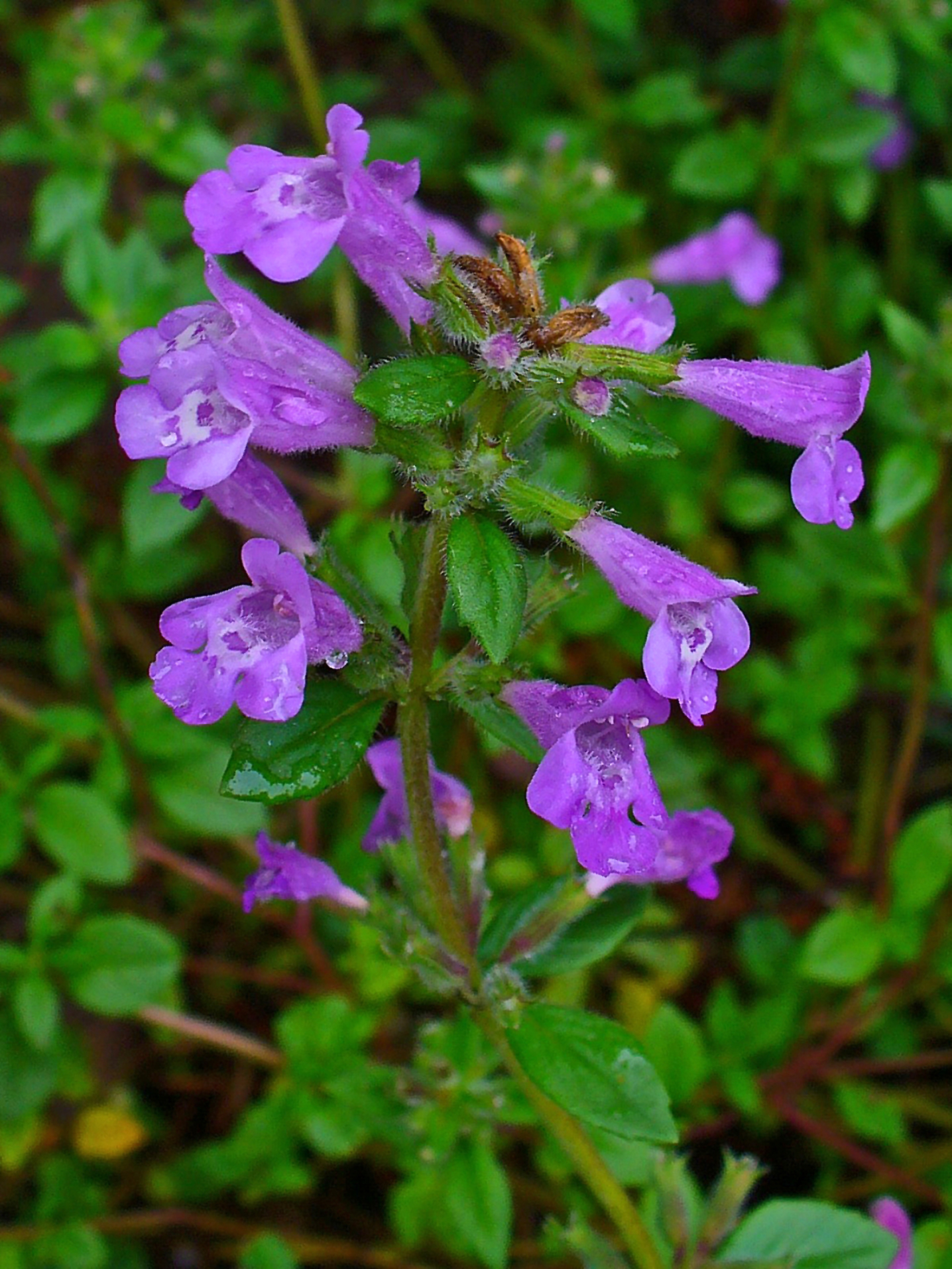
Clinopodium alpinum

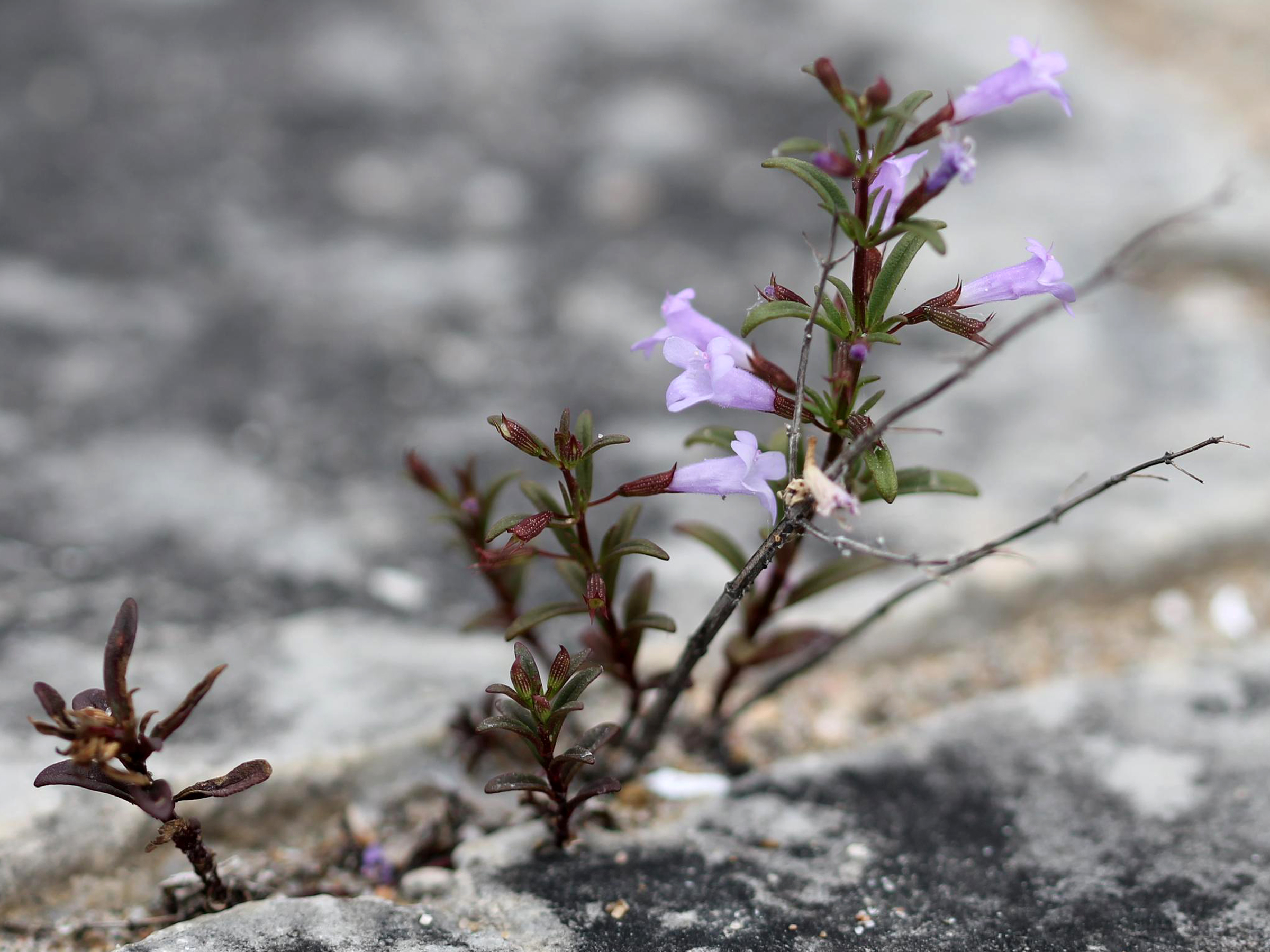
Clinopodium glabrum

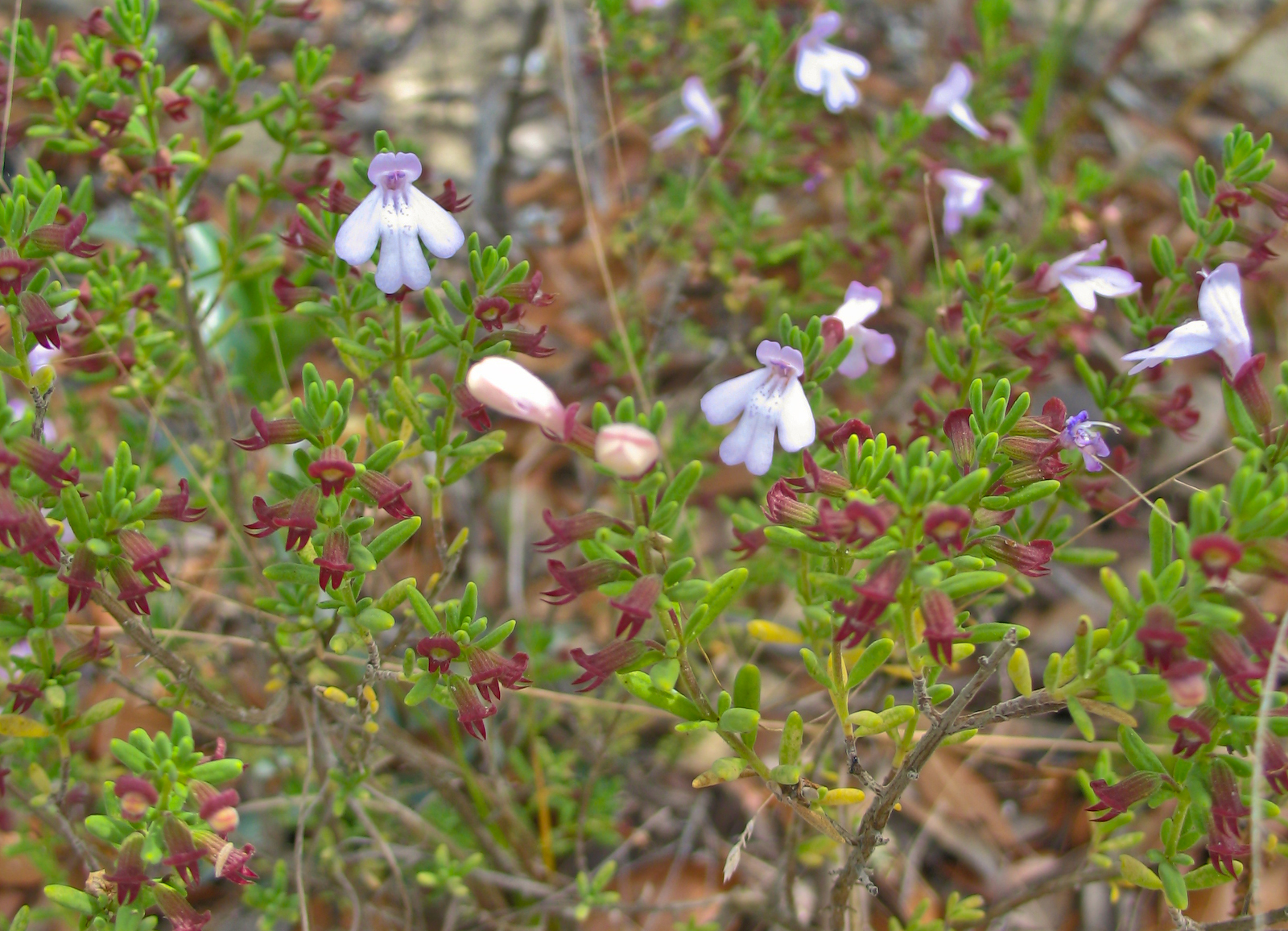
Clinopodium ashei

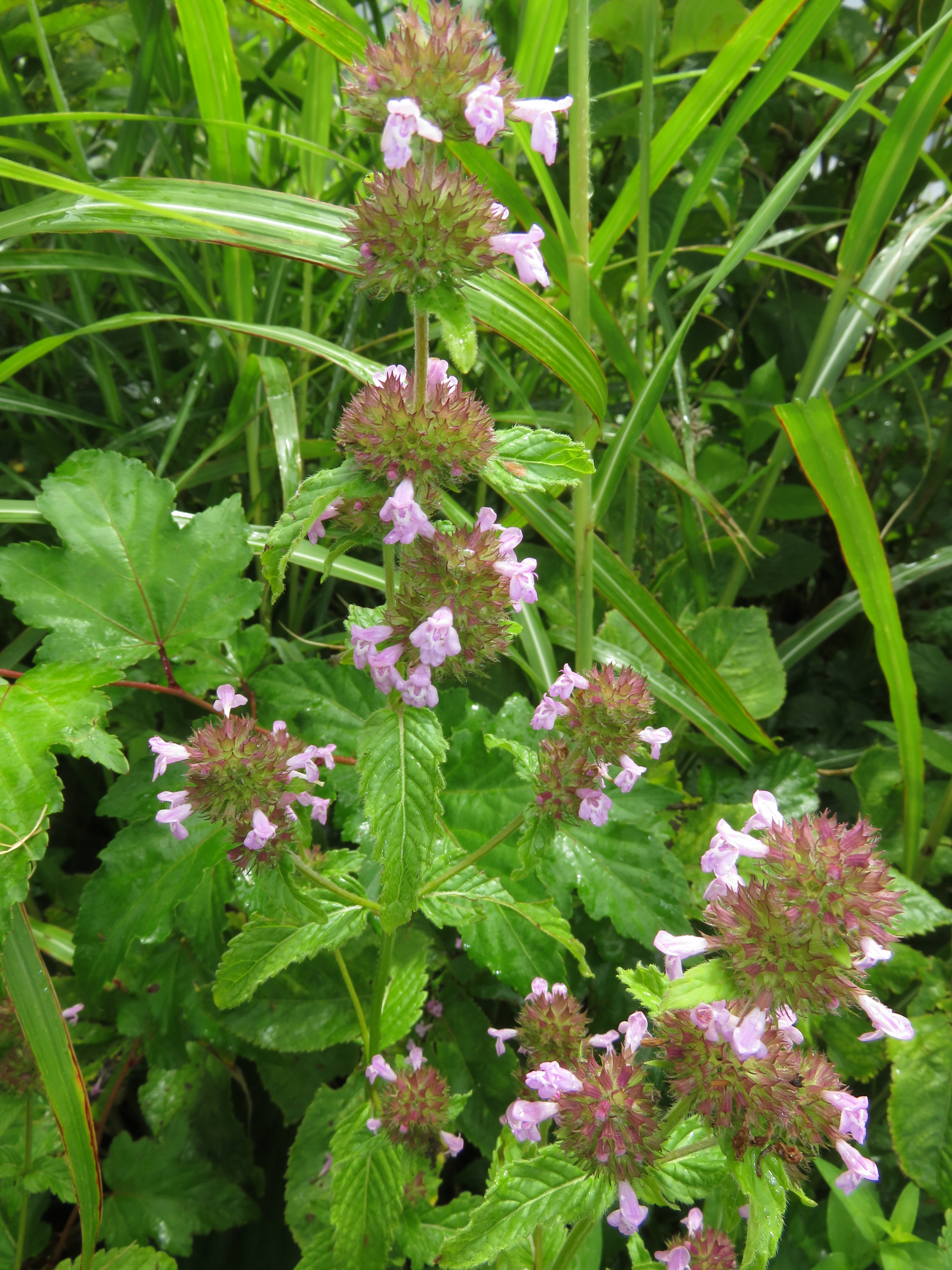
Clinopodium chinense

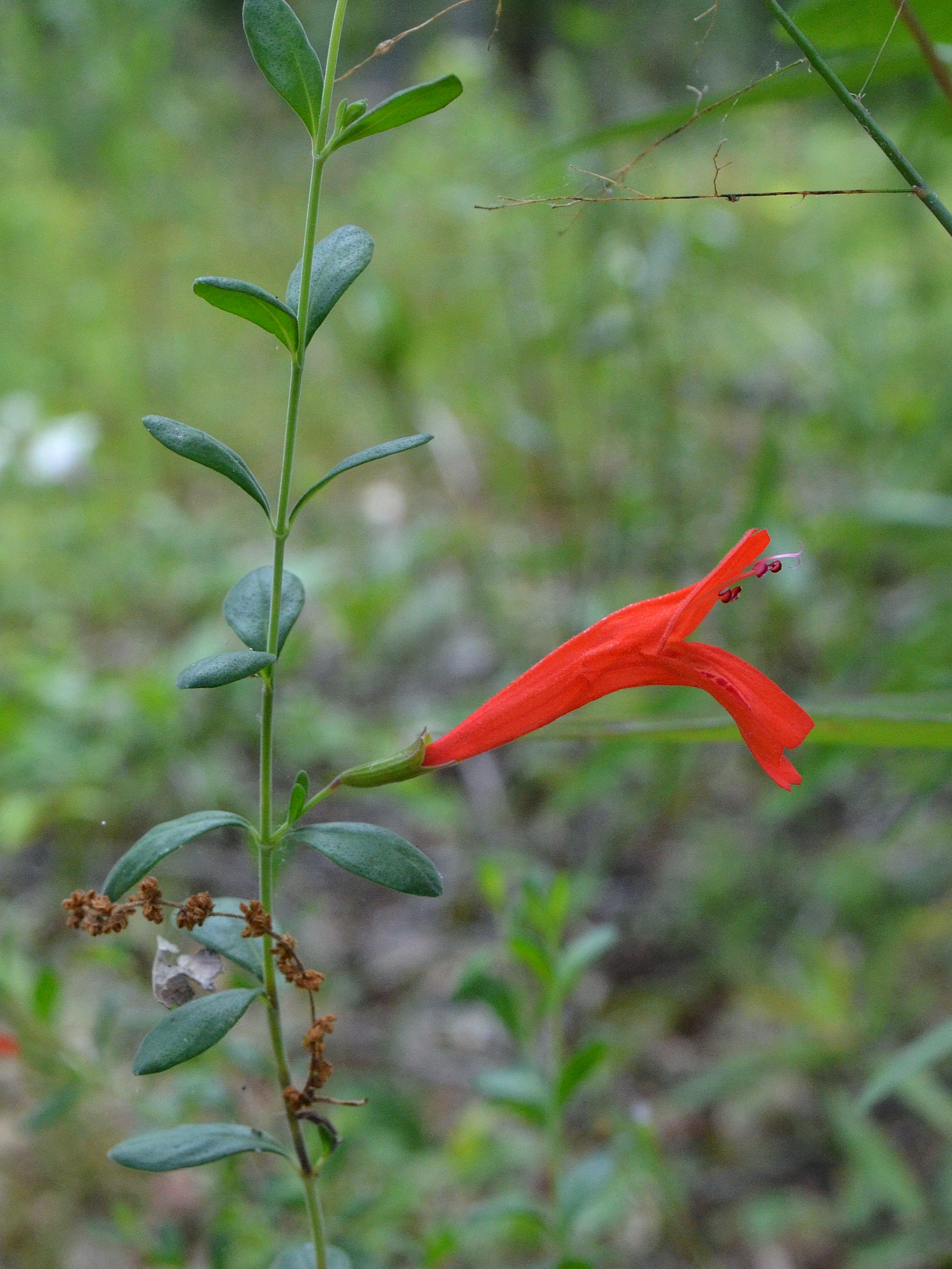
Clinopodium coccineum

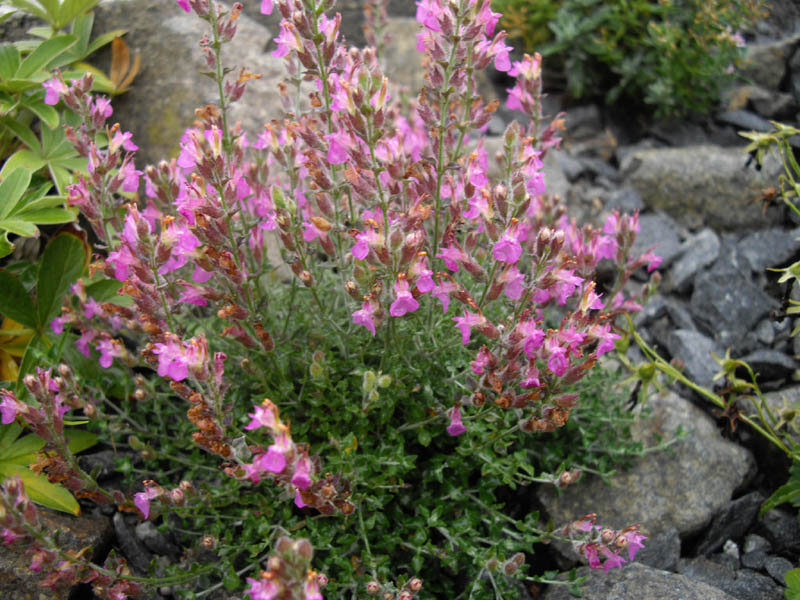
Clinopodium corsicum

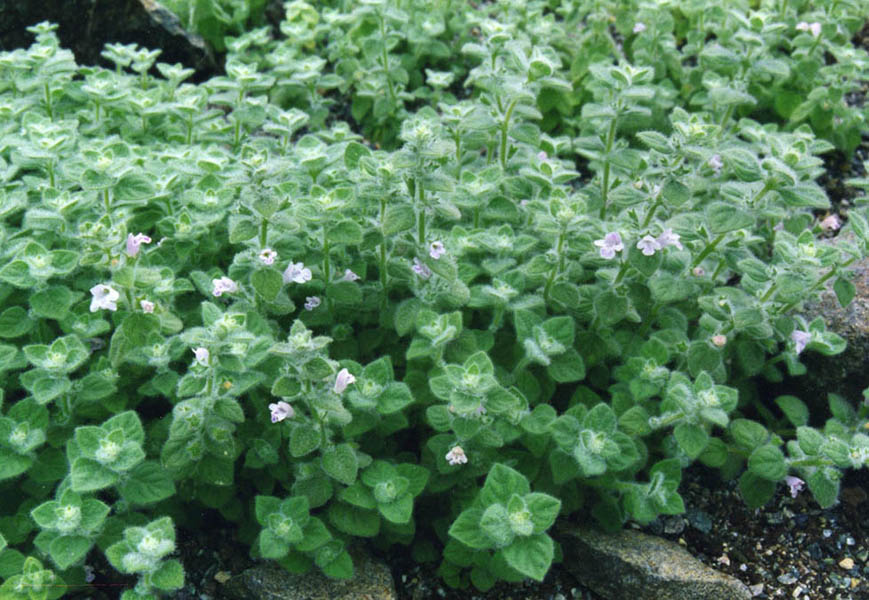
Clinopodium creticum

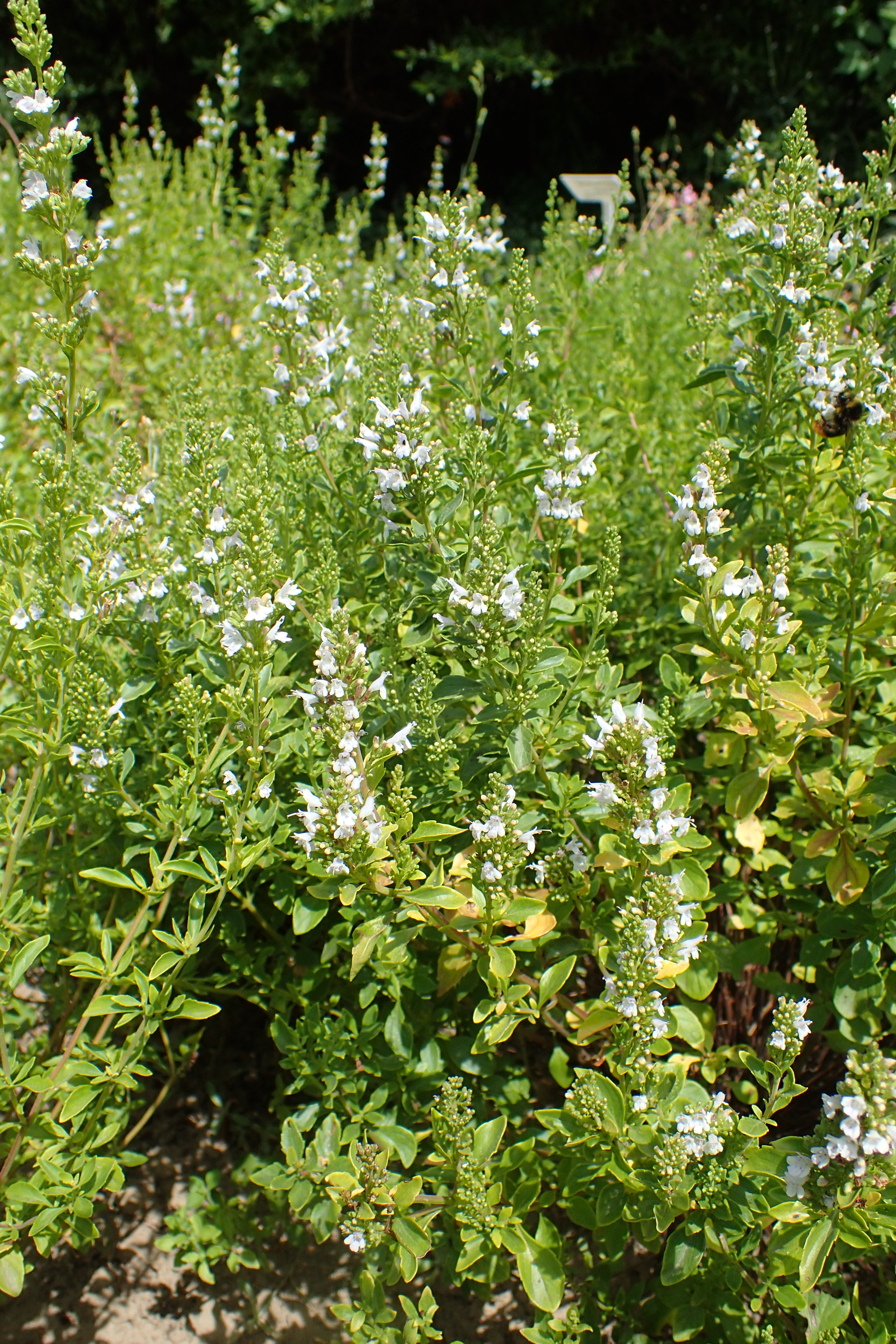
Clinopodium dalmaticum

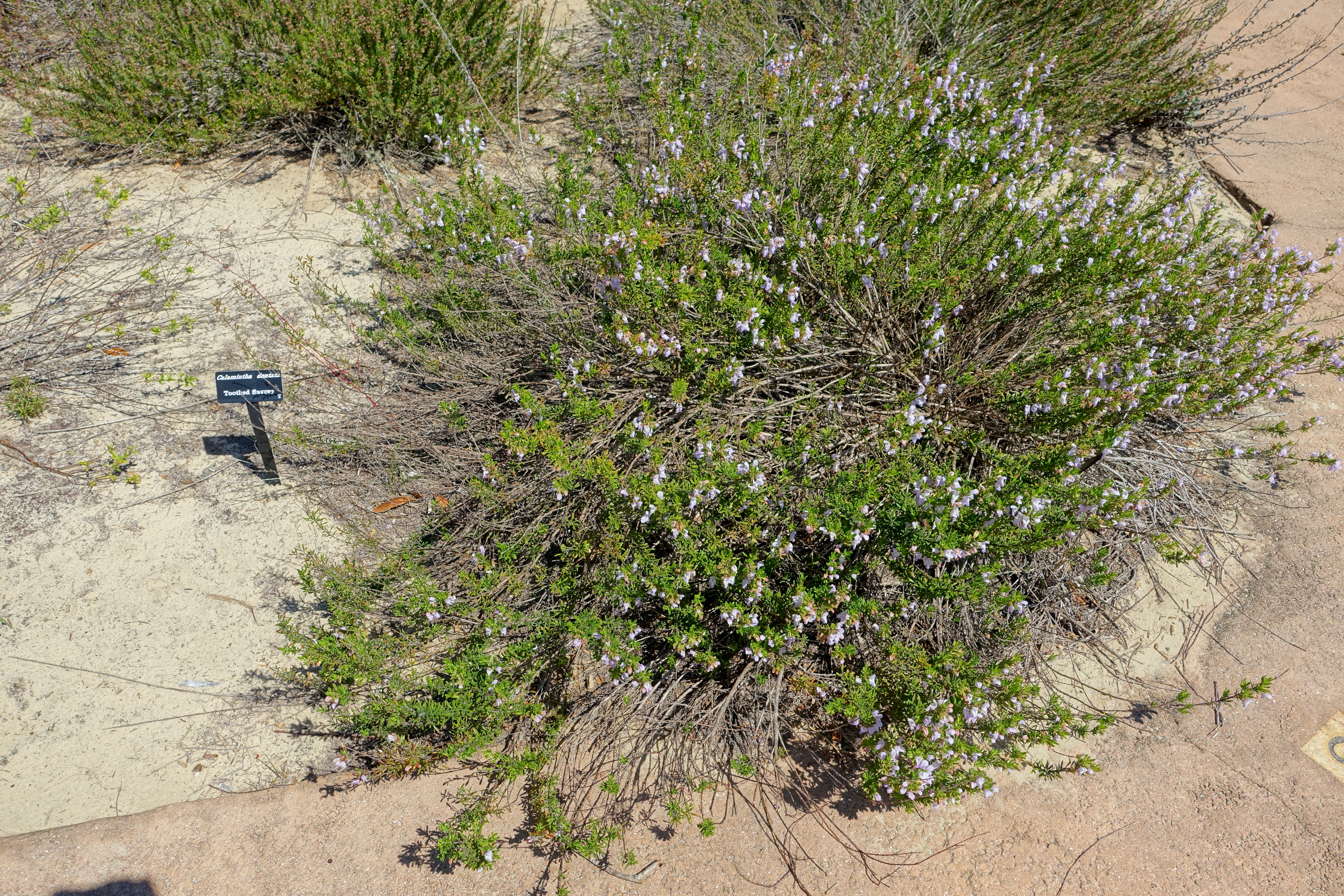
Clinopodium dentatum

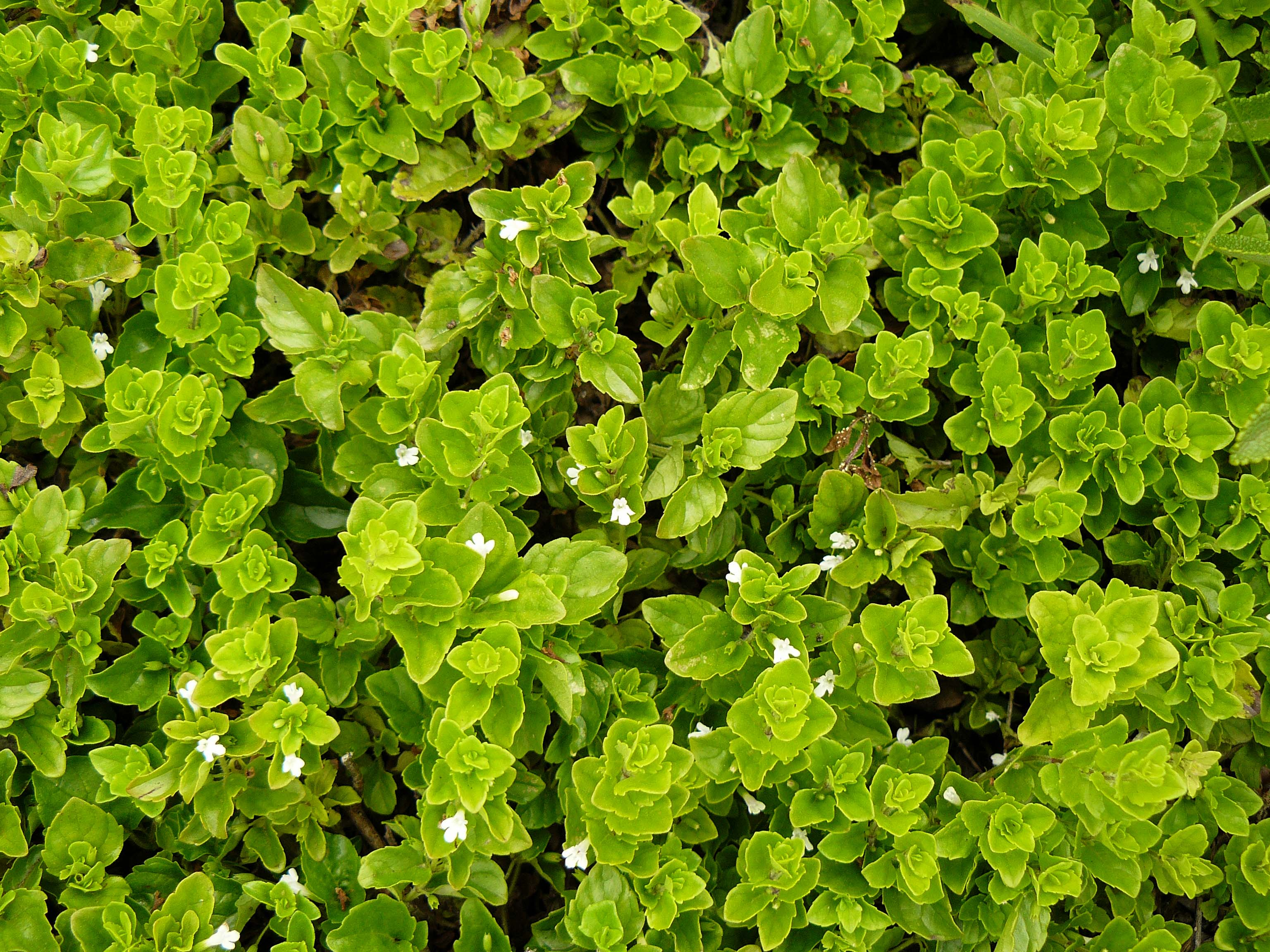
Clinopodium douglasii

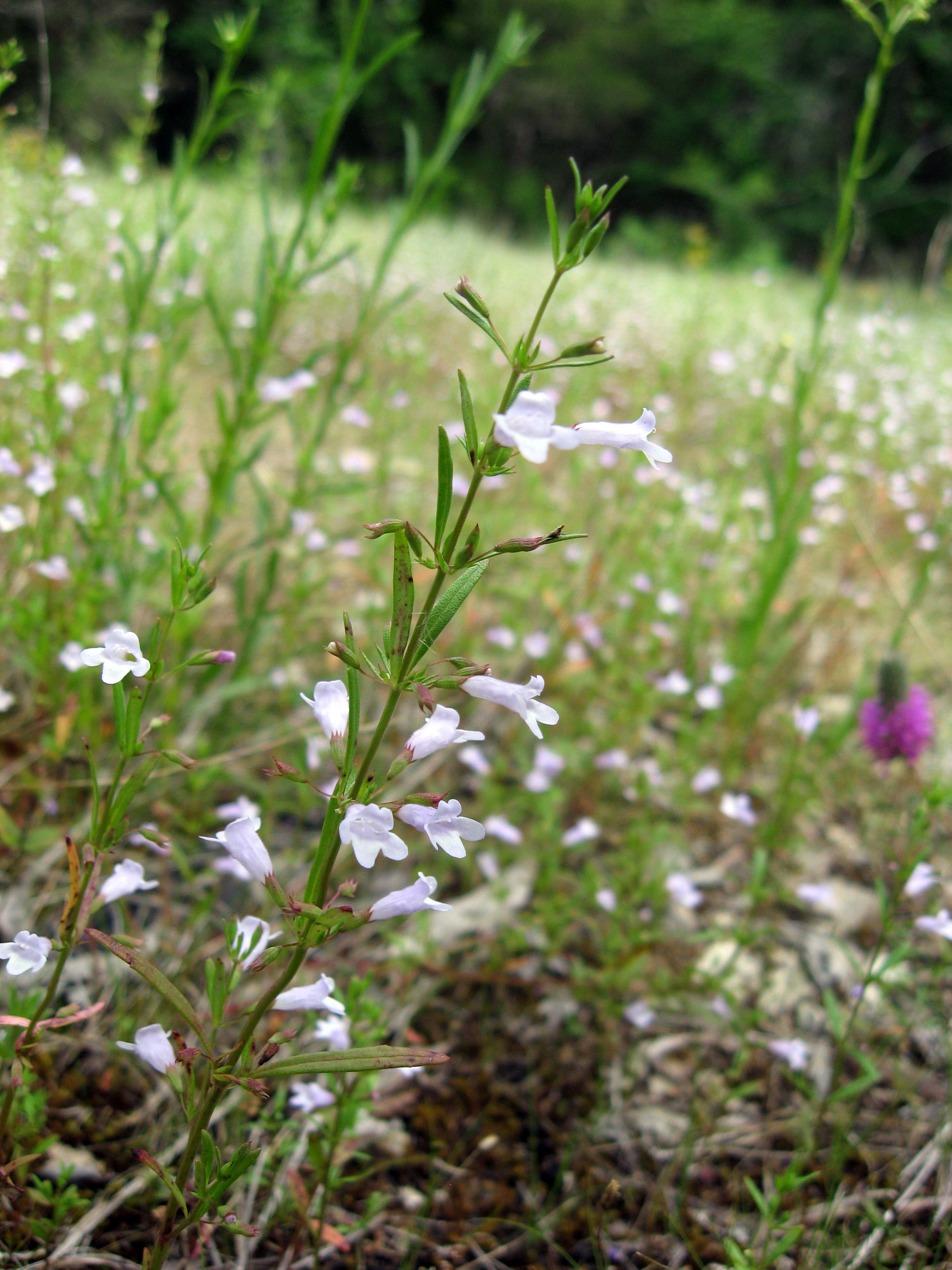
Clinopodium glabellum

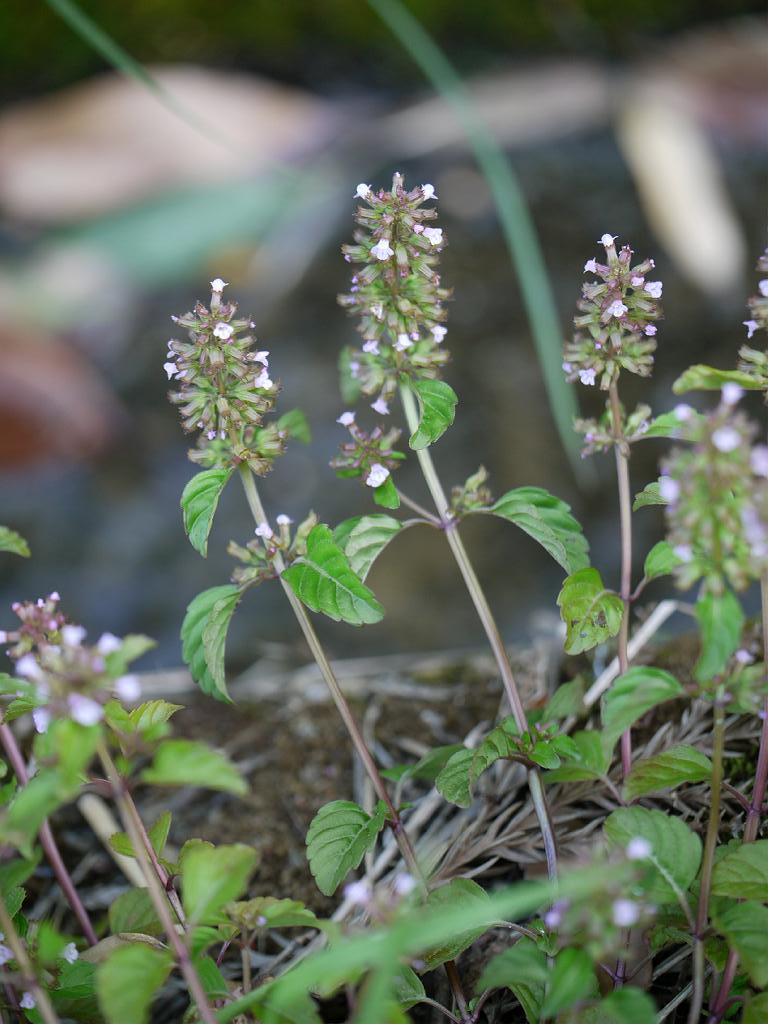
Clinopodium gracile

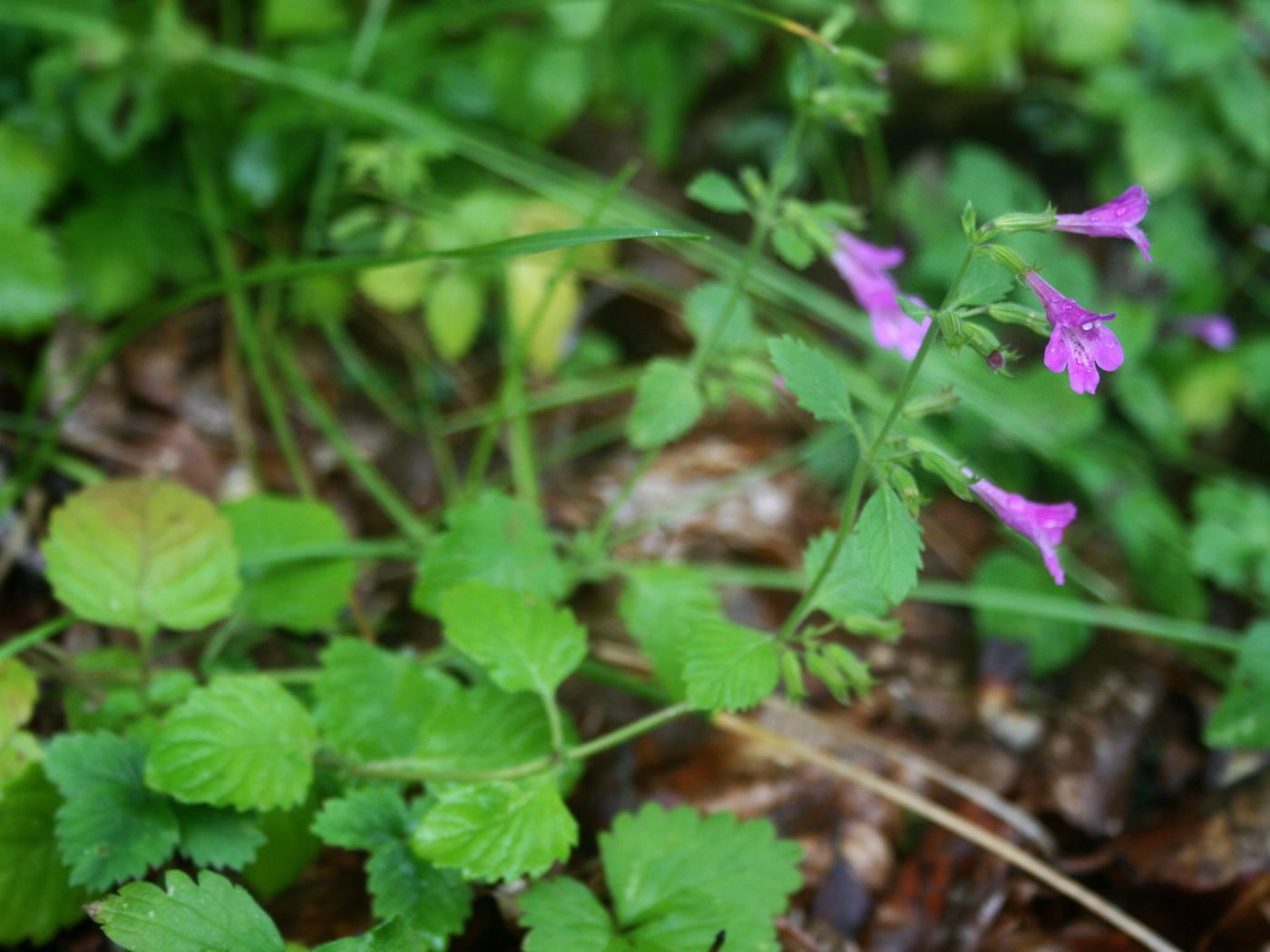
Clinopodium grandiflorum

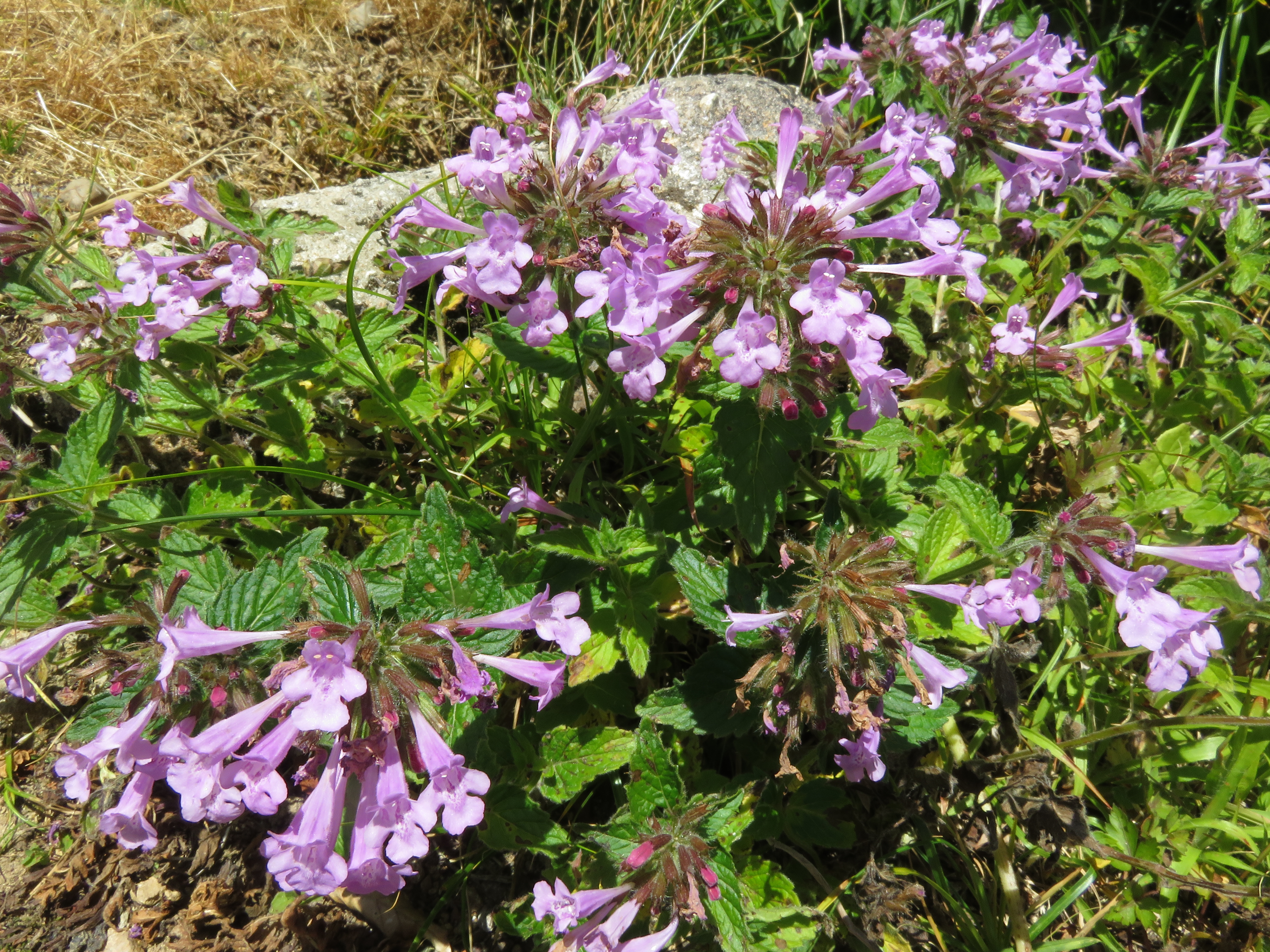
Clinopodium macranthum

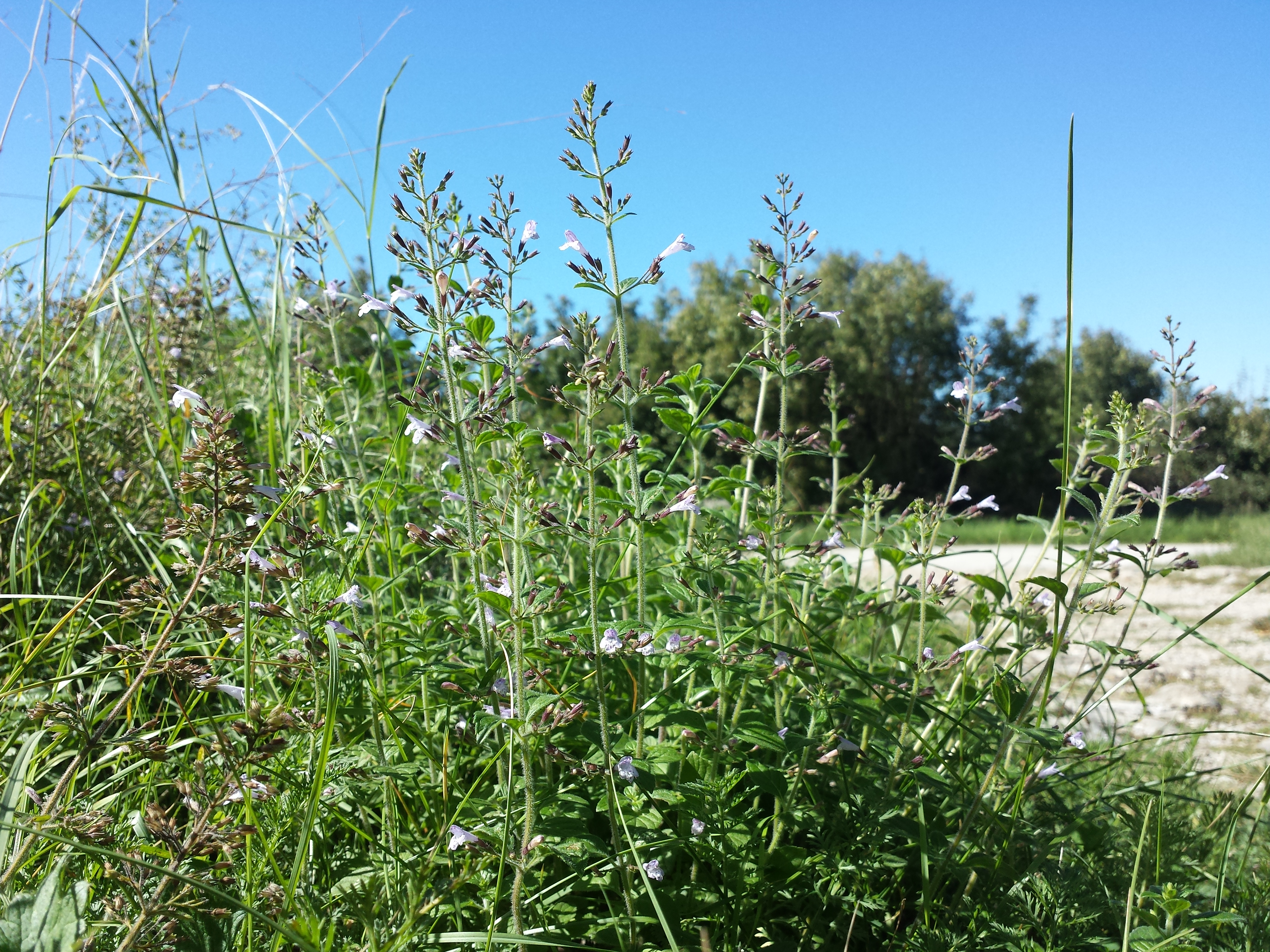
Clinopodium menthifolium

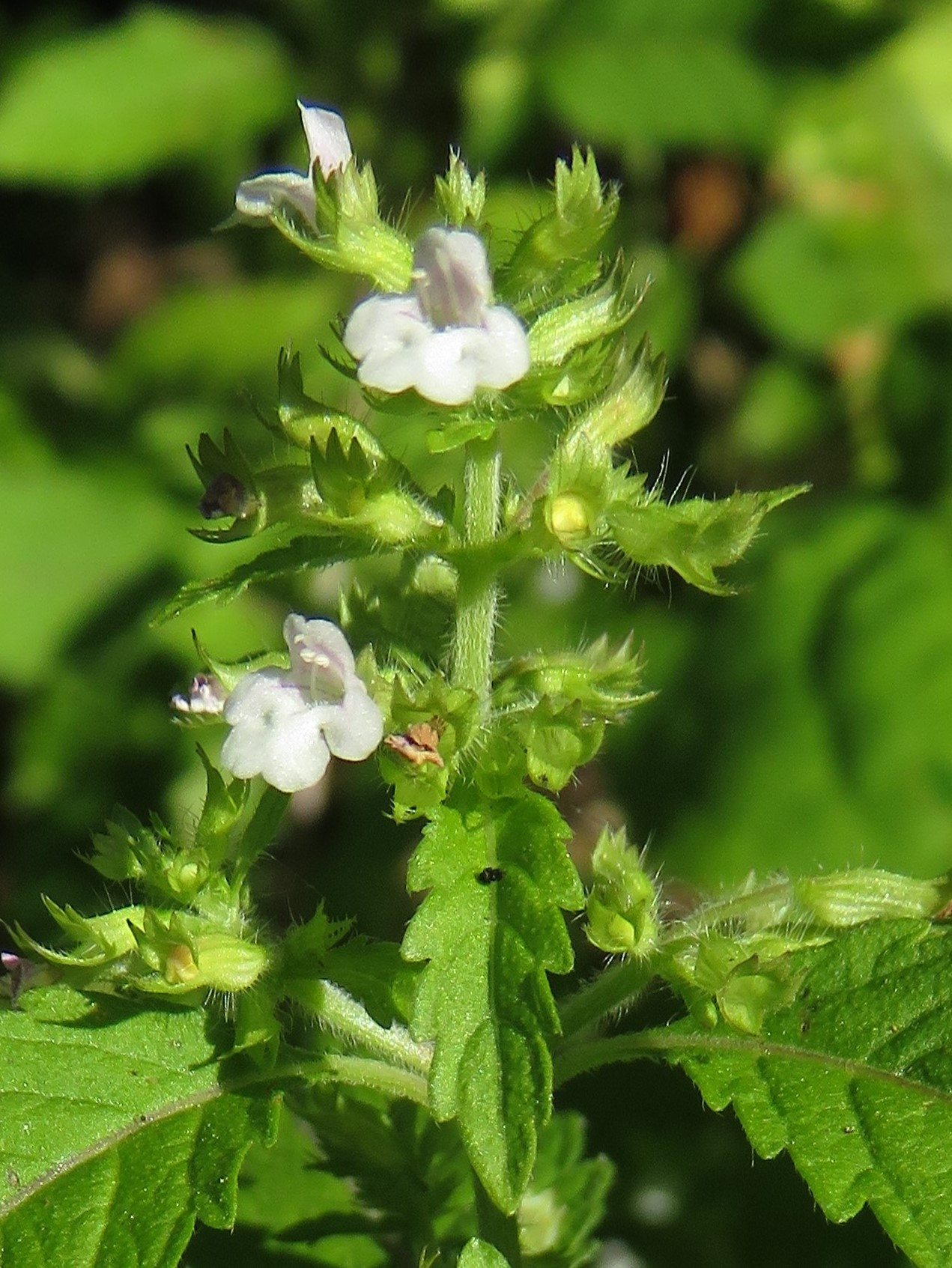
Clinopodium micranthum

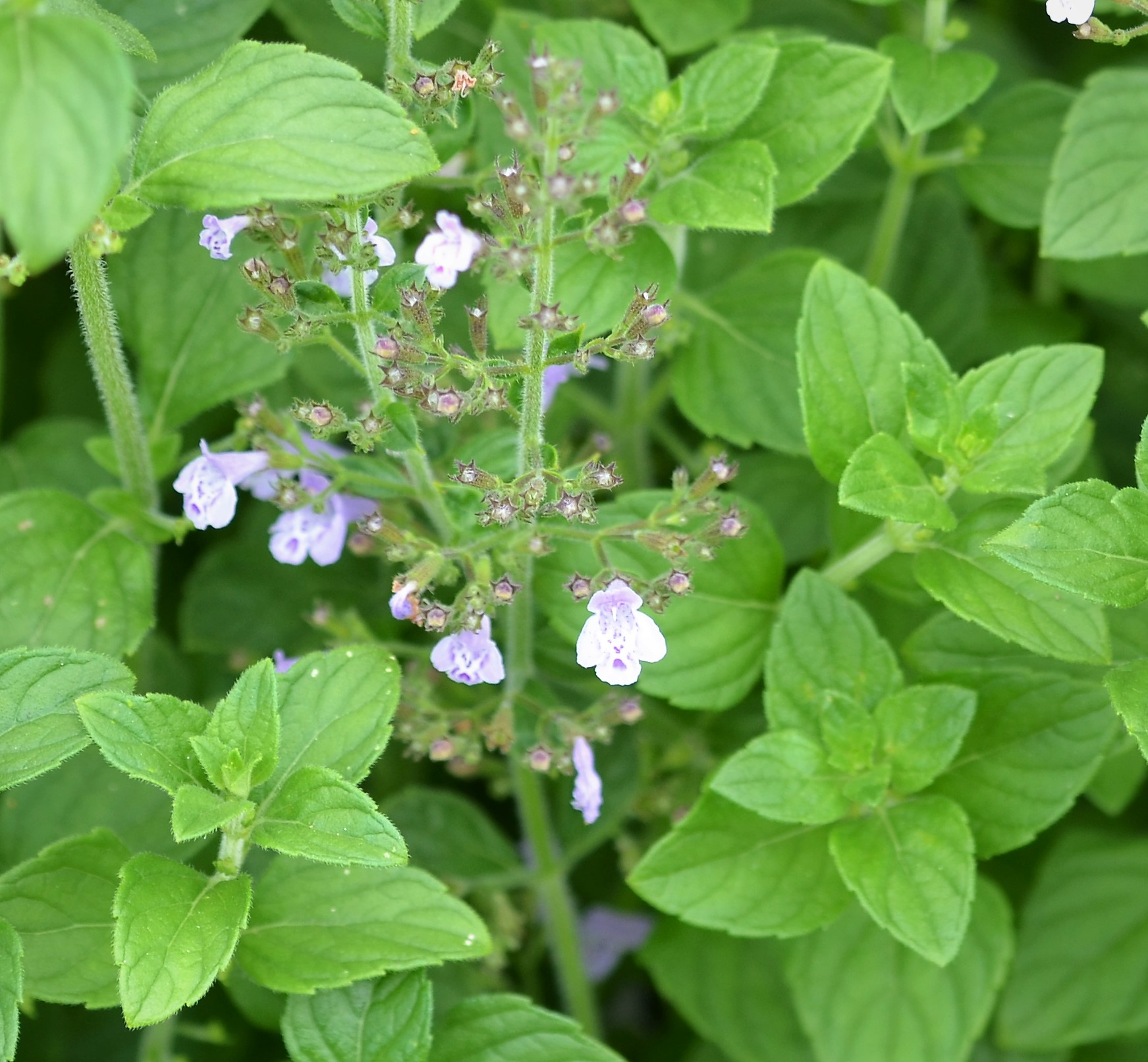
Clinopodium nepeta

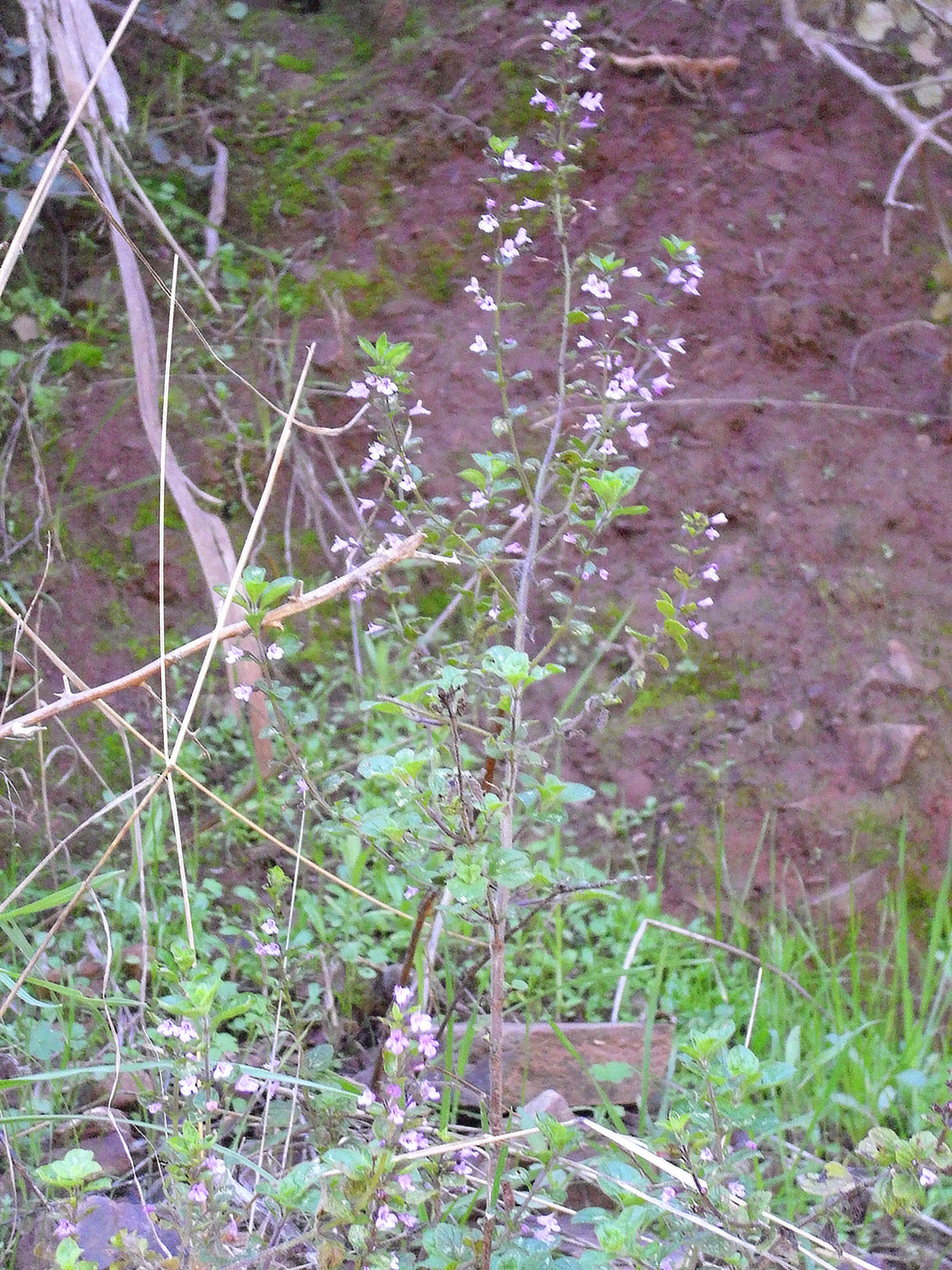
Clinopodium serpyllifolium

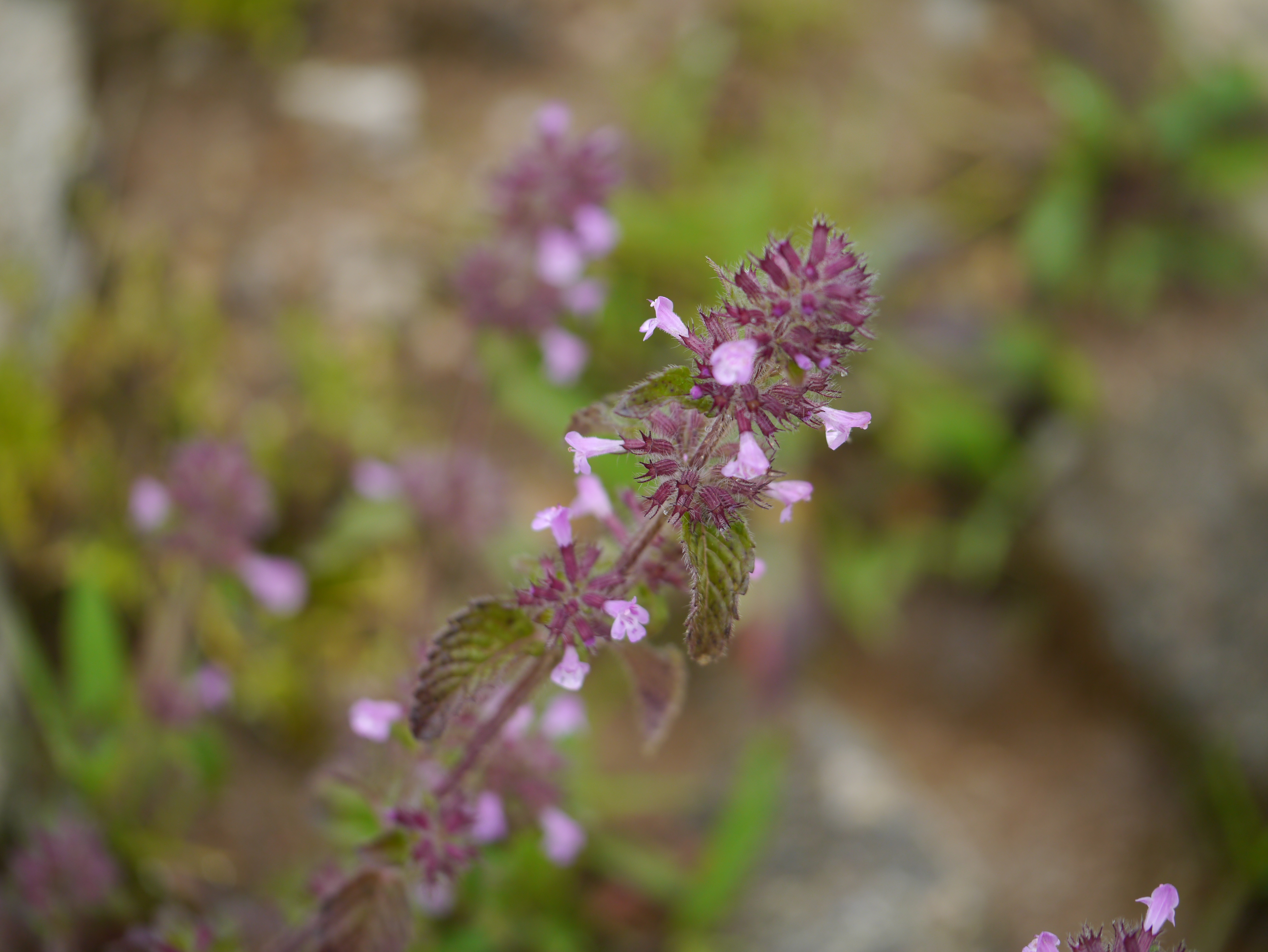
Clinopodium umbrosum
