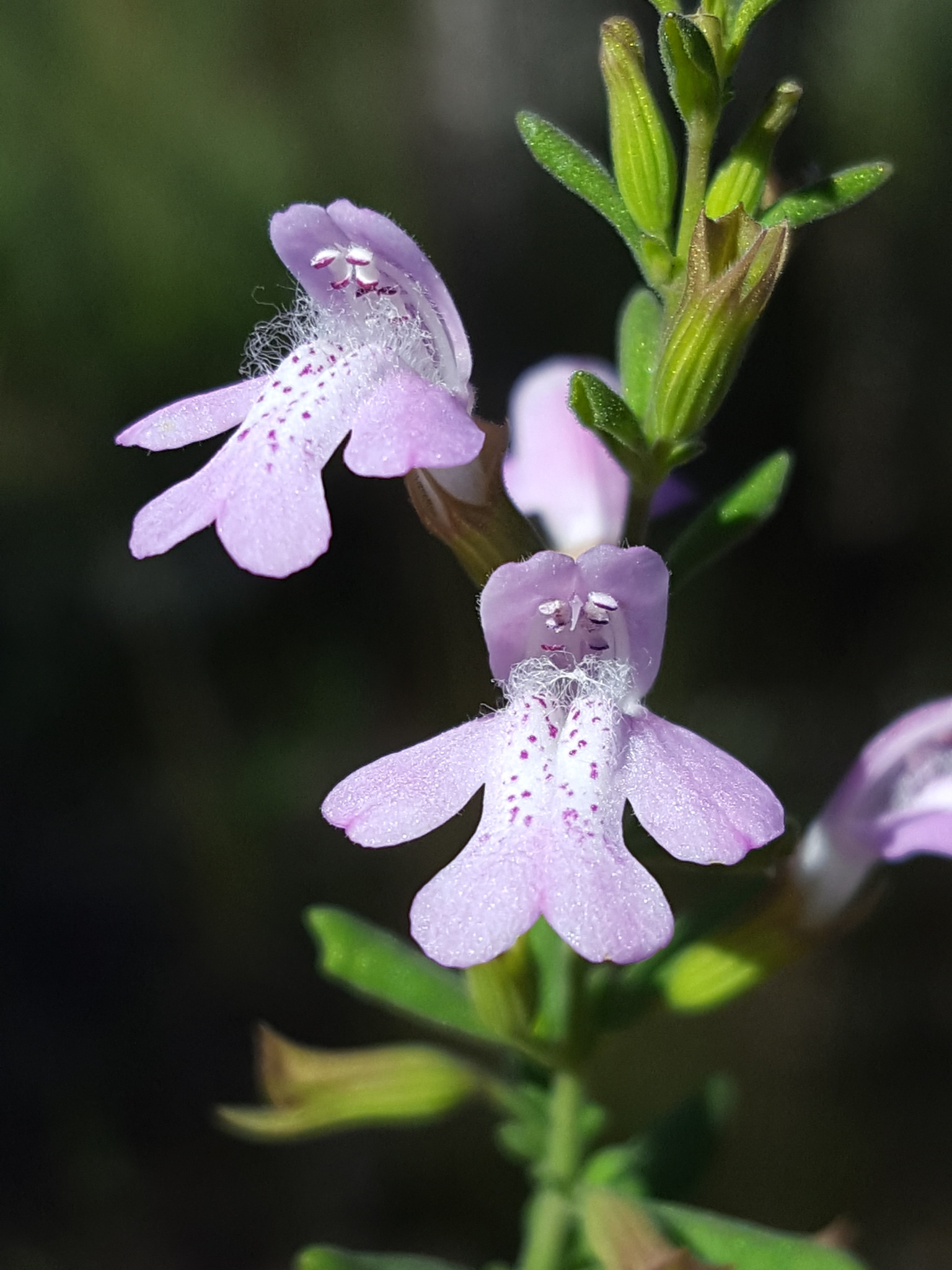

Conservation status
- Vulnerable (NatureServe)

Scientific classification
- Kingdom: Plantae
- Clade: Tracheophytes
- Clade: Angiosperms
- Clade: Eudicots
- Clade: Asterids
- Order: Lamiales
- Family: Lamiaceae
- Genus: Clinopodium
- Species: C. dentatum

Binomial name
- Clinopodium dentatum (Chapm.) Kuntze

Synonyms
- Calamintha dentata

= Clinopodium dentatum =

Species of flowering plant

Clinopodium dentatum (syn. Calamintha dentata) is a species of flowering plant in the mint family known by the common names toothed savory and Florida calamint. It is native to Florida and Georgia in the United States.

This bushy shrub grows up to 30 to 70 centimeters tall. It is aromatic, with a mint scent. The stems have thin, peeling, gray-bron bark. The oppositely arranged yellow-green leaves are lance-shaped to oval and roughly one centimeter in length. They are hairy and glandular. The flower has a hairy, lipped corolla about 1.5 centimeters long not counting its tubular throat. It is lavender in color with a pale, dark-flecked spot on the lower lip. This is "perhaps the weediest species of the genus," and is sometimes the dominant shrub in the habitat, becoming locally common.

This plant occurs in sandy habitat such as sandhills and the Florida scrub. It is also able to colonize disturbed habitat such as roadsides. Most occurrences are in Florida, but it is also known from Tattnall County, Georgia.

This plant may be threatened by the conversion of its habitat to silviculture.
