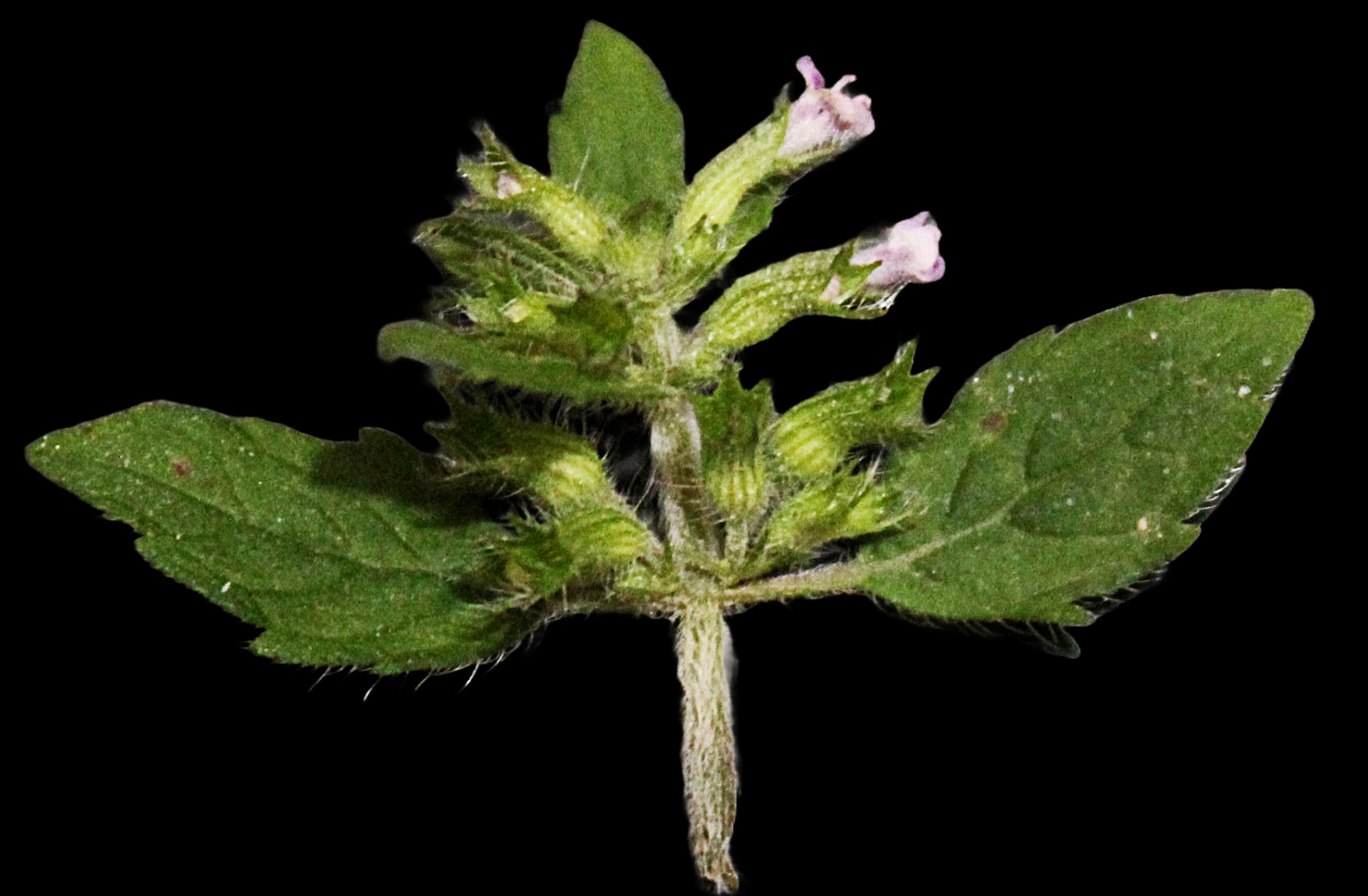
- Clinopodium kewensis inflorescence

Scientific classification
- Kingdom: Plantae
- Clade: Embryophytes
- Clade: Tracheophytes
- Clade: Angiosperms
- Clade: Eudicots
- Clade: Asterids
- Order: Lamiales
- Family: Lamiaceae
- Genus: Clinopodium
- Species: C. kewensis

Binomial name
- Clinopodium kewensis R.Chandra & Ö.Güner

= Clinopodium kewensis =

Species of plant from Himachal Pradesh, India

Clinopodium kewensis is a species of the Lamiaceae from the Northwestern Himalayas, Himachal Pradesh, India.

== Taxonomy and naming ==
Clinopodium kewensis was first formally described in 2025 by Rimjhim Chandra, Özal Güner & Çeti̇n Özlem, who published the description in the journal Phytotaxa. The specific epiphet is a metonym after the name of the world's largest botanical garden, The Royal Botanic Gardens, also known as Kew Gardens, in Kew, London.

Clinopodium kewensis is a plant species native to India.

== Description ==
Many-stemmed, perennial, rhizomes are woody and slender. Stem 17–25 cm long, ascending, brittle, slender, twisted, densely retrorse, white pubescent. Leaves ovate 6–20 × 2–13 mm, rounded at base, obtuse or acute at apex, margin shallowly serrate, sparsely pubescent at both surfaces; densely ciliate at leaf margins. Veins 4–5 pairs, substantially visible on both surfaces, not reaching to margins, camptodromous; petiole generally 2–7 mm long. Inflorescence lax with 2–6 verticillaster; semi-globose, 1.2–1.8 cm in diameter; peduncle generally 3 mm; floral leaves entire, sparsely pubescent on both surfaces; densely ciliate at leaf margins; apex bract-like. Bracts linear, about 5 mm, longer than pedicel, ribbed, white ciliate. Flower 2–6 per verticillaster. Pedicel up to 2–7 mm long. Calyx bilabiate, tubular, 11 veined, 7 mm long, glandular-pubescent, veins and teeth minutely hispid; upper teeth 3, subtriangular, short awned; lower teeth 2, subulate, awned. Corolla 1.2 cm long, tube straight, exceeding the calyx, slightly curved outward, to 3 mm wide at the throat. Stamen 4, didynamous, included in corolla; lower pair longer than upper, about 4 mm long. Carpel about 10 mm inside the corolla tube. Nutlets smooth, ellipsoid, brown, up to 3–5 mm long.

== Distribution and habitat ==
Clinopodium kewensis naturally grows in the Northwestern Himalayas in the Dhauladhar mountain range of Himachal Pradesh, India.

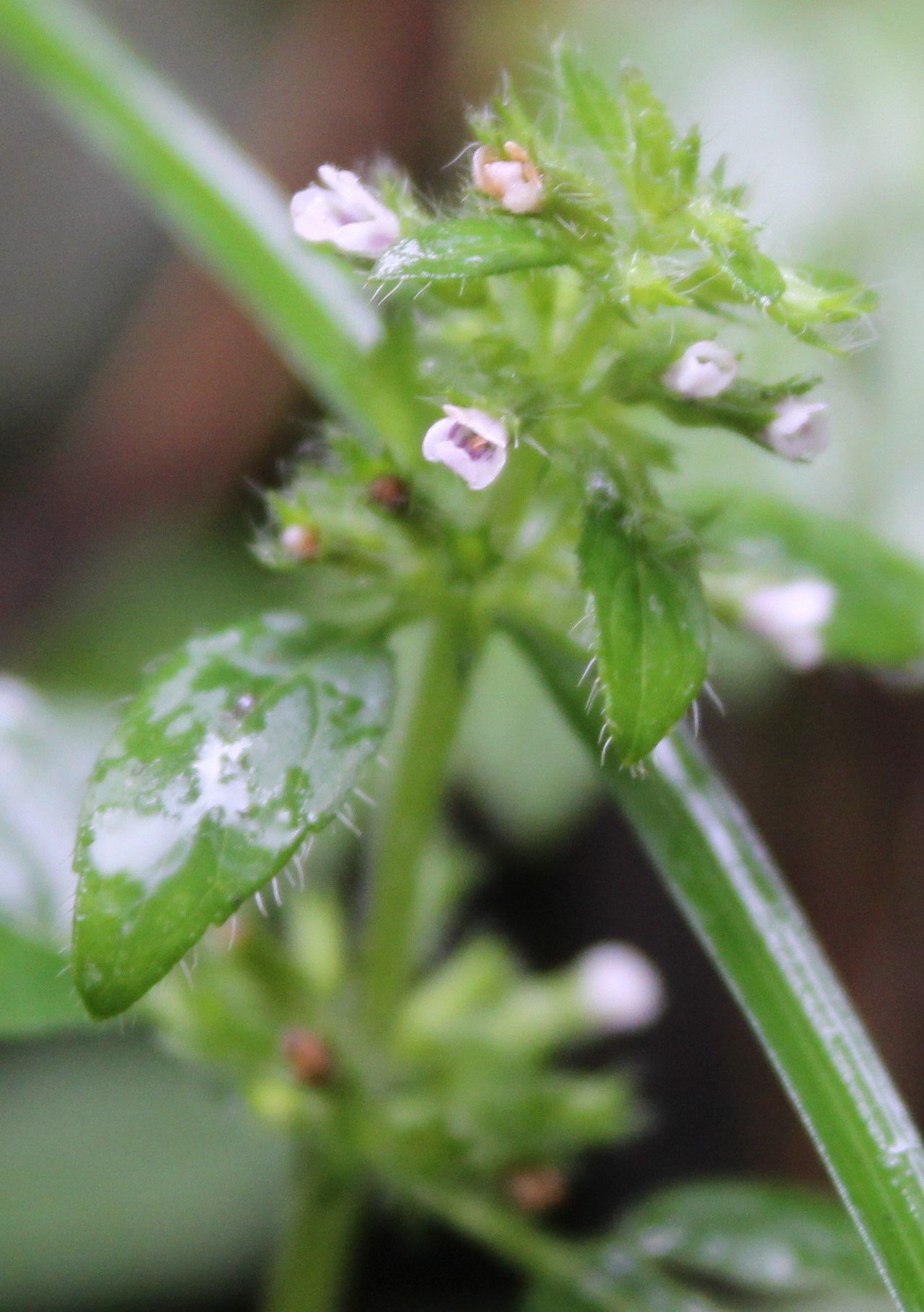
Clinopodium kewensis in its habitat

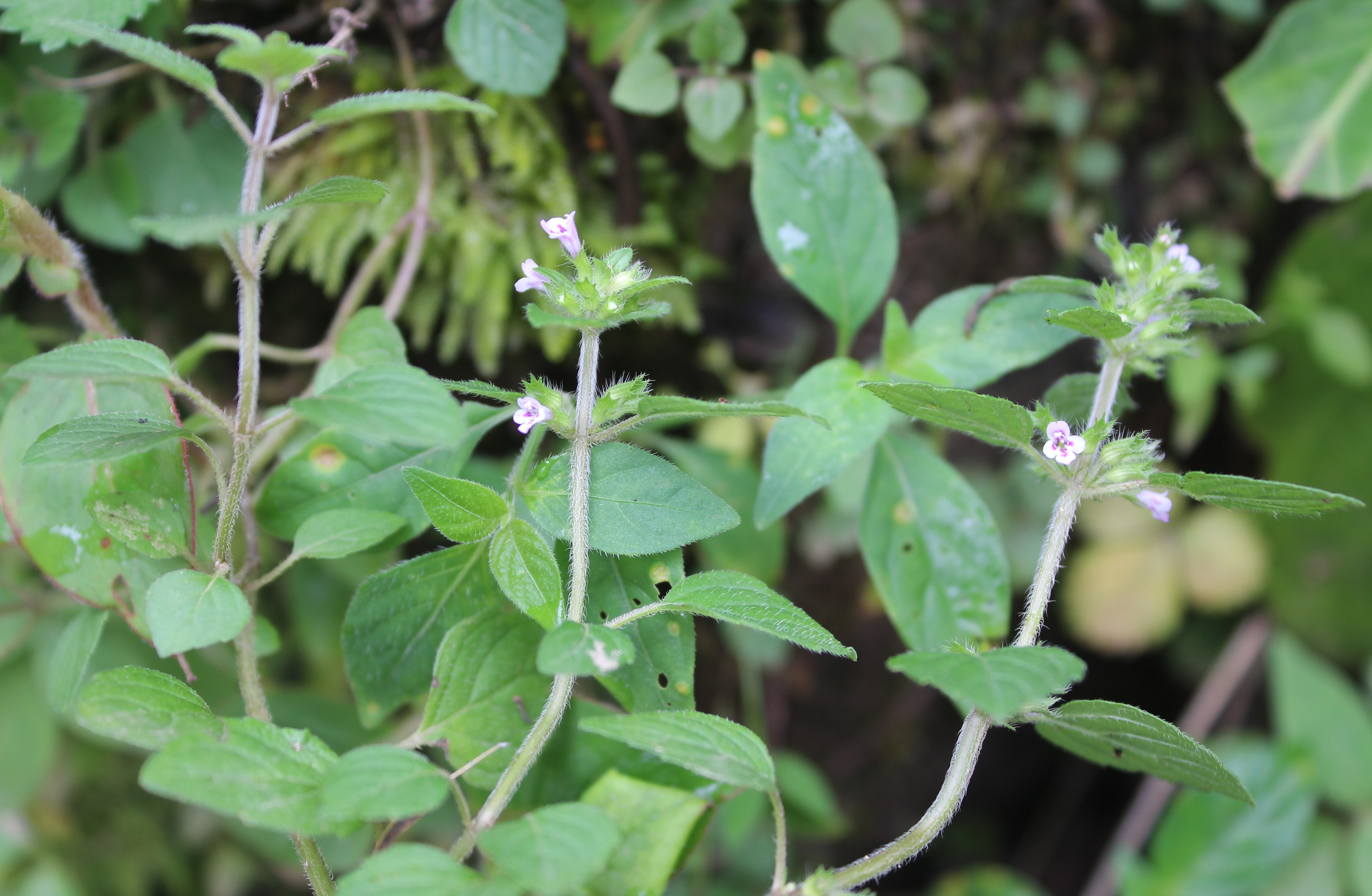
Clinopodium kewensis with trichomes

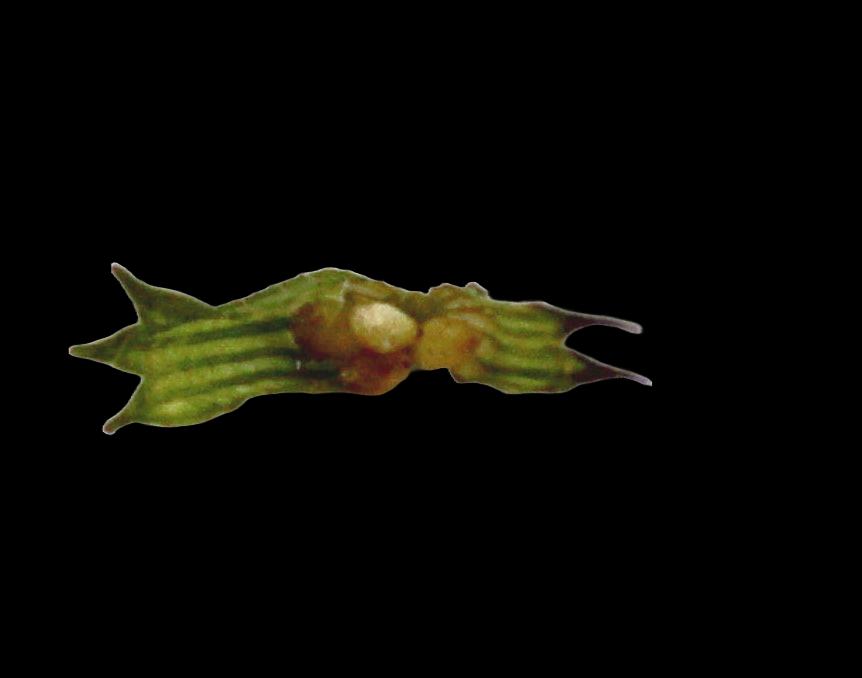
Nutlet of Clinopodium kewensis

== Etymology ==
The species epithet is derived from the name of the world's largest botanical garden, The Royal Botanic Gardens, also known as Kew Gardens, are in Kew, London.
