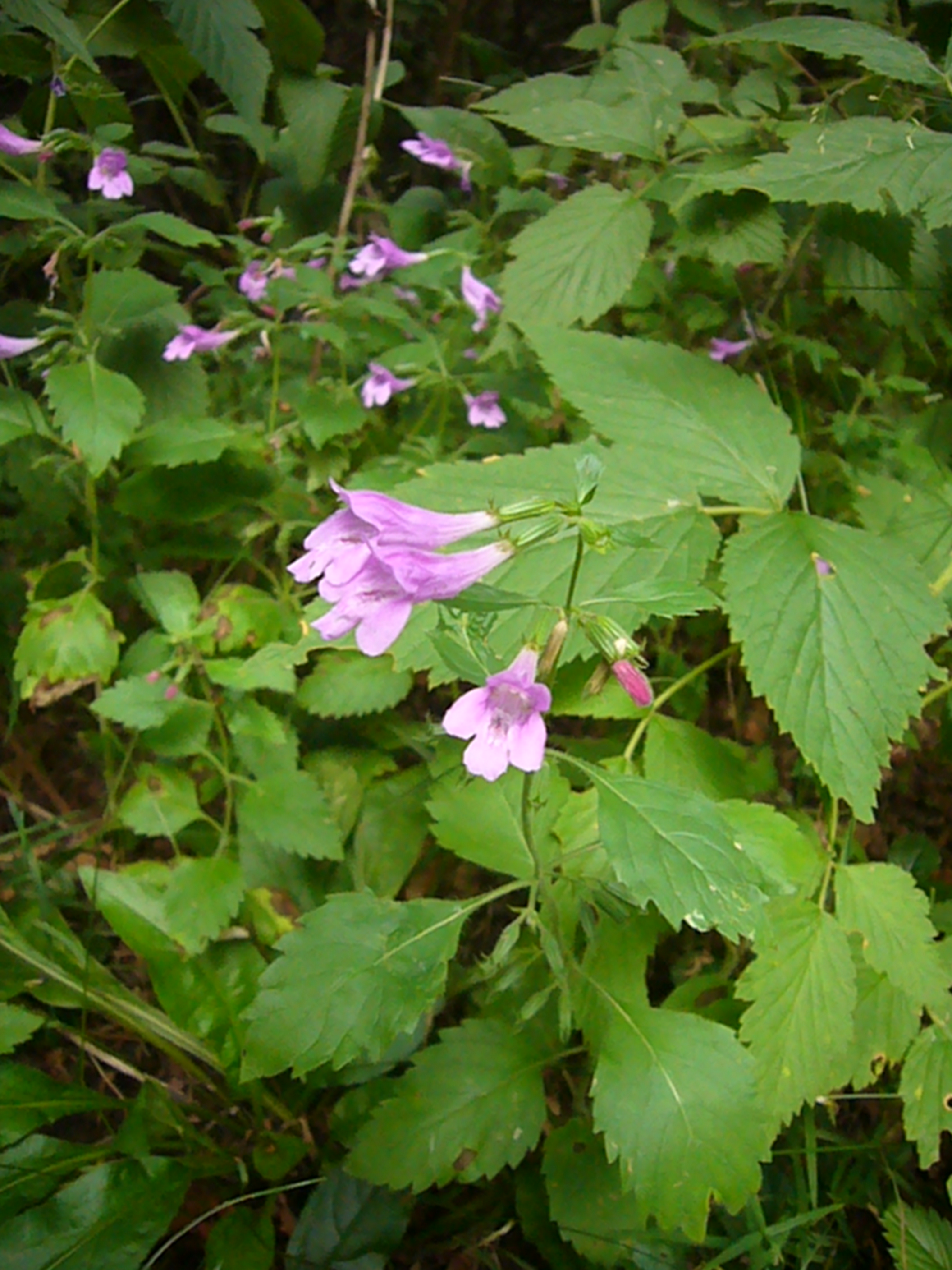

Scientific classification
- Kingdom: Plantae
- Clade: Tracheophytes
- Clade: Angiosperms
- Clade: Eudicots
- Clade: Asterids
- Order: Lamiales
- Family: Lamiaceae
- Genus: Clinopodium
- Species: C. grandiflorum

Binomial name
- Clinopodium grandiflorum (L.) Kuntze

Synonyms
- Acinos grandiflorus (L.) G.Don; Calamintha grandiflora (L.) Moench; Drymosiphon grandiflorus (L.) Melnikov; Faucibarba grandiflora (L.) Dulac; Melissa grandiflora L.; Satureja grandiflora (L.) Scheele; Thymus grandiflorus (L.) Scop.

= Clinopodium grandiflorum =

Large-flowered calamint

Species of flowering plant

Clinopodium grandiflorum, the large-flowered calamint, showy calamint or mint savory, is a species of ornamental plant.

== Description ==
C. grandiflorum is a perennial herb that grows up to 25 cm (9.8 in) tall. It has pink flowers and ovate green leaves.

== Distribution and habitat ==
It grows in certain mountains of western and southern Europe (Massif Central, Alps, Pyrénées,...) above 700 meters high. It can be found in beech forests.

== Use ==
It can be used in cooking, and in herbal medicine for bruises and cramps.. In the Aubrac region of France, it is used as an infusion and called "thé d'Aubrac" (Aubrac tea); it is appreciated for its digestive properties.
