= List of Clinopodium species =

As of May 2023, Plants of the World Online accepted about 190 species in the genus Clinopodium.

== A ==
- Clinopodium abchasicum Melnikov
- Clinopodium abyssinicum (Benth.) Kuntze
- Clinopodium acinos (L.) Kuntze
- Clinopodium acutifolium (Benth.) Govaerts
- Clinopodium adzharicum Melnikov
- Clinopodium albanicum (Griseb. ex K.Malý) Melnikov
- Clinopodium × alboviride (Faure & Maire) Melnikov
- Clinopodium album (Waldst. & Kit.) Bräuchler & Govaerts
- Clinopodium alexeenkoi Melnikov
- Clinopodium alpestre (Urb.) Harley
- Clinopodium alpinum (L.) Kuntze
- Clinopodium amabile Melnikov
- Clinopodium amissum (Epling & Játiva) Harley
- Clinopodium argenteum (Kunth) Govaerts
- Clinopodium arkansanum (Nutt.) House
- Clinopodium ashei (Weath.) Small
- Clinopodium atlanticum (Ball) N.Galland
- Clinopodium austro-osseticum Melnikov
- Clinopodium axillare (Rusby) Harley

== B ==
- Clinopodium banaoense (P.Herrera, I.E.Méndez & Bécquer) Melnikov
- Clinopodium barbatum (P.H.Davis) Melnikov
- Clinopodium barosmum (W.W.Sm.) Bräuchler & Heubl
- Clinopodium batumiense Melnikov
- Clinopodium betulifolium (Boiss. & Balansa) Kuntze
- Clinopodium bolivianum (Benth.) Kuntze
- Clinopodium brevicalyx (Epling) Harley & A.Granda
- Clinopodium breviflorum (Benth.) Govaerts
- Clinopodium brevifolium (Wahlenb.) Bräuchler & Hjertson
- Clinopodium brownei (Sw.) Kuntze
- Clinopodium bucheri (P.Wilson) Harley

== C ==
- Clinopodium × cadevallii (Sennen) Starm.
- Clinopodium candidissimum (Munby) Kuntze
- Clinopodium canescens (J.Presl) Melnikov
- Clinopodium capitellatum (Benth.) Kuntze
- Clinopodium caricum (P.H.Davis) Bräuchler & Heubl
- Clinopodium caroli-henricanum (Kit Tan & Sorger) Govaerts
- Clinopodium carolinianum Mill.
- Clinopodium caucasicum Melnikov
- Clinopodium cercocarpoides (Epling) Govaerts
- Clinopodium chandleri (Brandegee) P.D.Cantino & Wagstaff
- Clinopodium chilense (Benth.) Govaerts
- Clinopodium chinense (Benth.) Kuntze
- Clinopodium cilicicum (Hausskn. ex P.H.Davis) Bräuchler & Heubl
- Clinopodium cirenianum S.S.Ying
- Clinopodium clivorum (Epling) Govaerts
- Clinopodium coccineum (Nutt. ex Hook.) Kuntze
- Clinopodium colchicum Melnikov
- Clinopodium congestum (Boiss. & Hausskn.) Kuntze
- Clinopodium × conillii (Sennen) Starm.
- Clinopodium corsicum (Pers.) Govaerts
- Clinopodium creticum (L.) Kuntze
- Clinopodium cuifengense S.S.Ying
- Clinopodium cylindristachys (Epling & Játiva) Govaerts

== D ==
- Clinopodium dalmaticum (Benth.) Bräuchler & Heubl
- Clinopodium darwinii (Benth.) Kuntze
- Clinopodium debile (Bunge) Kuntze
- Clinopodium dentatum (Chapm.) Kuntze
- Clinopodium deprehensum Melnikov
- Clinopodium discolor (Diels) C.Y.Wu & S.J.Hsuan ex H.W.Li
- Clinopodium dolichodontum (P.H.Davis) Bräuchler & Heubl
- Clinopodium domingense (Urb. & Ekman) Govaerts
- Clinopodium douglasii (Benth.) Kuntze
- Clinopodium dumetorum Melnikov

== E ==
- Clinopodium ekmanianum (Epling & Alain) Harley
- Clinopodium elegans Melnikov
- Clinopodium euosmum (W.W.Sm.) Bräuchler & Heubl

== F ==
- Clinopodium fasciculatum (Benth.) Govaerts
- Clinopodium fauriei (H.Lév. & Vaniot) H.Hara
- Clinopodium flabellifolium (Epling & Játiva) Govaerts
- Clinopodium foliolosum (Benth.) Govaerts
- Clinopodium frivaldszkyanum (Degen) Bräuchler & Heubl

== G ==
- Clinopodium ganderi (Epling) Govaerts
- Clinopodium gilanicum Melnikov
- Clinopodium gilliesii (Benth.) Kuntze
- Clinopodium glabellum (Michx.) Kuntze
- Clinopodium gracile (Benth.) Kuntze
- Clinopodium grandiflorum (L.) Kuntze
- Clinopodium graveolens (M.Bieb.) Kuntze
- Clinopodium griseum (Epling) Harley

== H ==
- Clinopodium hakkaricum Dirmenci & Firat
- Clinopodium helenae Melnikov
- Clinopodium heterotrichum (Boiss. & Reut.) Govaerts
- Clinopodium hintoniorum (B.L.Turner) Govaerts
- Clinopodium hispidulum (Boiss. & Reut.) Govaerts
- Clinopodium hohenackeri Melnikov
- Clinopodium × hostii (Caruel) Bräuchler
- Clinopodium hydaspidis (Falc. ex Benth.) Kuntze

== I ==
- Clinopodium integerrimum Boriss.
- Clinopodium italicum (Huter) Bräuchler

== J ==
- Clinopodium jacquelinae Schmidt-Leb.
- Clinopodium jaliscanum (McVaugh & R.Schmid) Govaerts
- Clinopodium jamesonii (Benth.) Govaerts
- Clinopodium javanicum (Blume) I.M.Turner
- Clinopodium junctionis (Epling & Játiva) Govaerts

== K ==
- Clinopodium kallaricum (Jamzad) Bordbar
- Clinopodium kilimandschari (Gürke) Ryding
- Clinopodium krupkinae Melnikov
- Clinopodium kunashirense Prob.
- Clinopodium kurachense Melnikov

== L ==
- Clinopodium lanceolatum Melnikov
- Clinopodium latifolium (H.Hara) T.Yamaz. & Murata
- Clinopodium laxiflorum (Hayata) K.Mori
- Clinopodium libanoticum (Boiss.) Kuntze
- Clinopodium loesenerianum (Mansf.) A.Granda
- Clinopodium longipes C.Y.Wu & S.J.Hsuan ex H.W.Li
- Clinopodium ludens (Shinners) A.Pool

== M ==
- Clinopodium macranthum (Makino) H.Hara
- Clinopodium macrostemum (Moc. & Sessé ex Benth.) Kuntze
- Clinopodium maderense (Henrard) Govaerts
- Clinopodium maritimum (Benth.) Kuntze
- Clinopodium matthewsii (Briq.) Govaerts
- Clinopodium megalanthum (Diels) C.Y.Wu & S.J.Hsuan ex H.W.Li
- Clinopodium menitskyi Melnikov
- Clinopodium menthifolium (Host) Merino
- Clinopodium mexicanum (Benth.) Govaerts
- Clinopodium micranthum (Regel) H.Hara
- Clinopodium micromerioides (Hemsl.) Govaerts
- Clinopodium mimuloides (Benth.) Kuntze
- Clinopodium minae (Lojac.) Peruzzi & F.Conti
- Clinopodium mirum Melnikov
- Clinopodium × mixtum (Ausserd. ex Heinr.Braun & Sennholz) Starm.
- Clinopodium molle (Benth.) Kuntze
- Clinopodium multicaule (Maxim.) Kuntze
- Clinopodium multiflorum (Ruiz & Pav.) Kuntze
- Clinopodium mutabile (Epling) Harley
- Clinopodium myrianthum (Baker) Ryding

== N ==
- Clinopodium nanum (P.H.Davis & Doroszenko) Govaerts
- Clinopodium neglectum Melnikov
- Clinopodium nepalense (Kitam. & Murata) Bräuchler & Heubl
- Clinopodium nepeta (L.) Kuntze
- Clinopodium novorossicum Melnikov
- Clinopodium nubigenum (Kunth) Kuntze
- Clinopodium nummulariifolium (Boiss.) Kuntze

== O ==
- Clinopodium obovatum (Ruiz & Pav.) Govaerts
- Clinopodium odorum (Griseb.) Harley
- Clinopodium omeiense C.Y.Wu & S.J.Hsuan ex H.W.Li

== P ==
- Clinopodium pallidum (Epling) Govaerts
- Clinopodium palmeri (A.Gray) Kuntze
- Clinopodium paradoxum (Vatke) Ryding
- Clinopodium persicum Melnikov
- Clinopodium × pillichianum (J.Wagner) Govaerts
- Clinopodium pilosum J.R.I.Wood
- Clinopodium piperitum (D.Don) Murata
- Clinopodium plicatulum (Epling) Govaerts
- Clinopodium pojarkovae Melnikov
- Clinopodium polycephalum (Vaniot) C.Y.Wu & S.J.Hsuan
- Clinopodium pomelianum Kuntze
- Clinopodium procumbens (Greenm.) Harley
- Clinopodium pulchellum (Kunth) Govaerts
- Clinopodium pulegium (Rochel) Bräuchler

== R ==
- Clinopodium rankiniae I.E.Méndez
- Clinopodium revolutum (Ruiz & Pav.) Govaerts
- Clinopodium ritsaense Melnikov
- Clinopodium robustum (Hook.f.) Ryding
- Clinopodium rouyanum (Briq.) Govaerts

== S ==
- Clinopodium sandalioticum (Bacch. & Brullo) Bacch. & Brullo ex Peruzzi & F.Conti
- Clinopodium sardoum (Asch. & Levier) Peruzzi & F.Conti
- Clinopodium schusteri (Urb.) Govaerts
- Clinopodium selerianum (Loes.) Govaerts
- Clinopodium sericeum (C.Presl ex Benth.) Govaerts
- Clinopodium sericifolium (Epling & Játiva) Govaerts
- Clinopodium serpyllifolium (M.Bieb.) Kuntze
- Clinopodium shaofengkouensis S.S.Ying
- Clinopodium simense (Benth.) Kuntze
- Clinopodium sirnakense (Firat & Akçiçek) Firat & Bräuchler
- Clinopodium soczavae Melnikov
- Clinopodium speciosum (Hook.) Govaerts
- Clinopodium sphenophyllum (Epling) Govaerts
- Clinopodium striatum (Ruiz & Pav.) Govaerts
- Clinopodium suaveolens (Sm.) Kuntze
- Clinopodium suborbiculare (Alain) Greuter & R.Rankin
- Clinopodium syriacum Melnikov

== T ==
- Clinopodium talladeganum B.R.Keener & Floden
- Clinopodium tauricola (P.H.Davis) Govaerts
- Clinopodium taxifolium (Kunth) Govaerts
- Clinopodium taygeteum (P.H.Davis) Bräuchler
- Clinopodium tenellum (Epling) Harley
- Clinopodium tomentosum (Kunth) Govaerts
- Clinopodium trapezuntinum Melnikov
- Clinopodium troodi (Post) Govaerts

== U ==
- Clinopodium uhligii (Gürke) Ryding
- Clinopodium umbrosum (M.Bieb.) K.Koch

== V ==
- Clinopodium vanum (Epling) Harley & A.Granda
- Clinopodium vardarense (Šilic) Govaerts
- Clinopodium vargasii (Epling & Mathias) Govaerts
- Clinopodium vernayanum (Brenan) Ryding
- Clinopodium vimineum (L.) Kuntze
- Clinopodium vulgare L.

== W ==
- Clinopodium wardii (C.Marquand & Airy Shaw) Bräuchler
- Clinopodium weberbaueri (Mansf.) Govaerts
- Clinopodium woronowii Melnikov
- Clinopodium wulinianum S.S.Ying
- Clinopodium wutaianum S.S.Ying
