= Satureja gilliesii =

The scientific name Satureja gilliesii has been used for two different species of plants:

- Satureja gilliesii (Graham) Briq., basionym Gardoquia gilliesii Graham, a synonym of Clinopodium chilense (Benth.) Govaerts
- Satureja gilliesii (Benth.) Briq., nom. illeg., basionym Micromeria gilliesii Benth., a synonym of Clinopodium gilliesii (Benth.) Kuntze

It should not be confused with Satureja gillesii, a name associated with Calamintha gillesii Sennen, a synonym of Clinopodium nepeta subsp. nepeta.
