= Herb Strewer =

Obsolete UK royal servant position

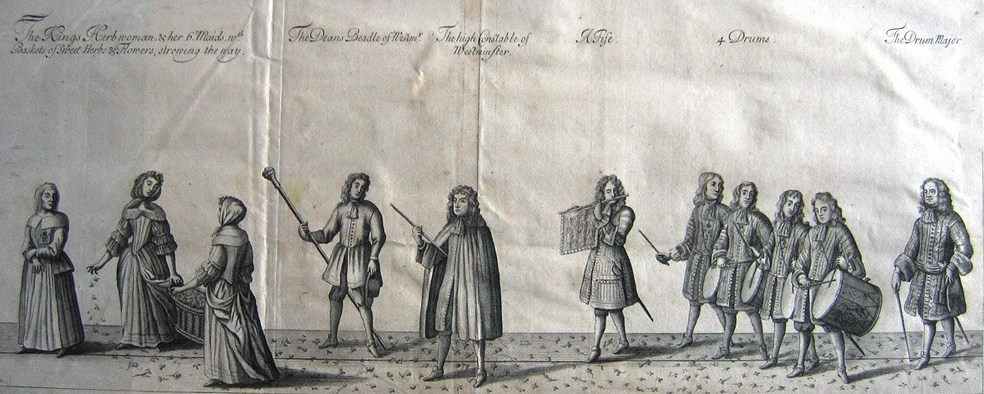
Herb strewing at the 1685 coronation procession of King James II and Queen Mary of Modena

The post of Herb Strewer is an obsolete position in the United Kingdom dating back to the late 17th century. The primary duty of the Herb Strewer was to distribute herbs and flowers throughout the royal apartments in order to mask bad aromas (such as those from the Thames which was particularly unhygienic before the construction of London's network of sewers).

The earliest recorded Herb Strewer was Bridget Rumney in 1660, who received an annual salary of £24. The last full-time Herb Strewer was Mary Rayner, who served George III and two of his sons for a total of 43 years.

For his coronation in 1821, George IV appointed an old friend, Anne Fellowes, to the post, and she and her six attendants scattered flowers and herbs along the carpet of Westminster Abbey. She wore a traditional dress of white satin with a scarlet mantle trimmed with gold, a head dress of gold wheat intermixed with laurel and oak leaves, and bore a gold badge and chain.

Neither William IV nor any subsequent British monarchs have appointed a Herb Strewer for their coronations. Nevertheless, the Fellowes claim this position for the eldest unmarried daughter of the family. Jessica Fellowes, the niece of Julian Fellowes, applied for the coronation of Charles III in 2023. However, the palace decided against reinstating the role.

Thomas Tusser, a regular at the court of Henry VIII, lists twenty-one strewing herbs in his 1557 instructional poem, Five Hundred Points of Good Husbandrie: basil, lemon balm, chamomile, costmary, cowslips, daisies, fennel, germander, hyssop, lavender, spike lavender, cotton lavender, marjoram, maudeline (sweet yarrow), pennyroyal, roses, red mints, sage, tansy, violets, and winter savory. Strewing herbs are also described in a book by John Gerard, botanist and advisor to Elizabeth I on matters of horticulture.
