= Hill, Evans & Co =

Former vinegar manufacturers

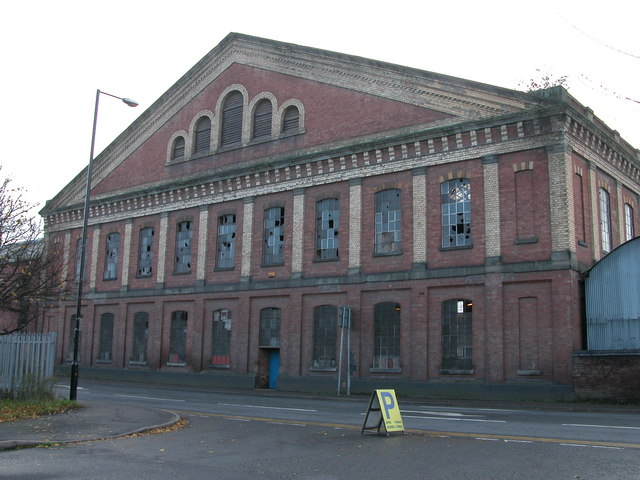
The Great Filling Hall before refurbishment, November 2006

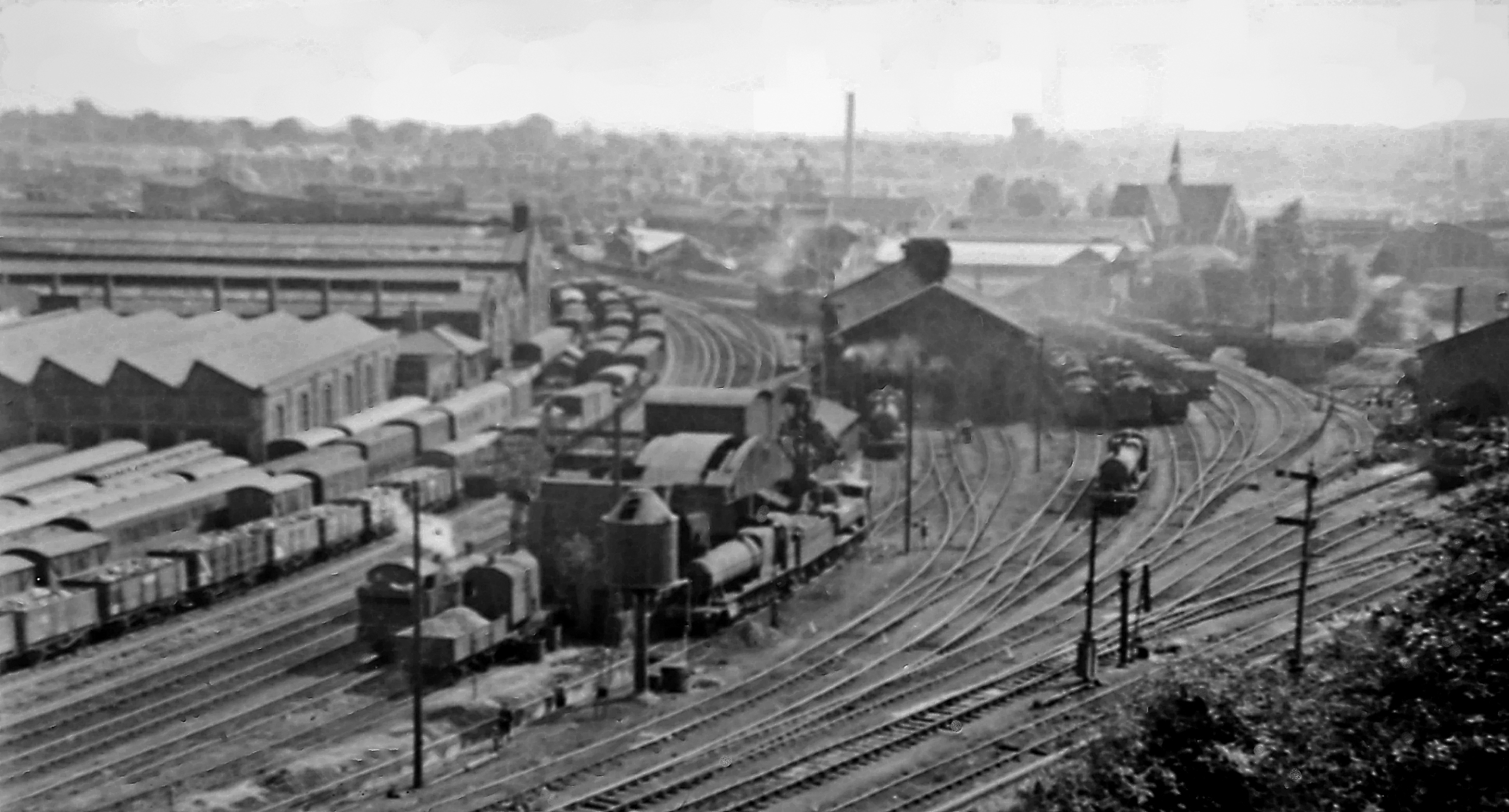
A panorama shot across the Worcester loop-line. The "Passenger" Shed is in the centre, the "Goods" Shed on the right, while on the left is the ex-GWR Locomotive Works. Between the two engine sheds is the "Vinegar Branch", which goes down through the town to serve Hill, Evans & Co, the Vulcan Works, and Heenan & Froude

Hill, Evans & Co Ltd were vinegar manufacturers based in Worcester, England. Founded in 1830 and at one time the world's largest producer of vinegar, the works closed in 1965.

== History ==
Hill, Evans & Co was founded in the centre of Worcester in 1830 by two chemists, William Hill and Edward Evans. The pair started producing vinegar, but later the company also produced: wines from raisin, gooseberry, orange, cherry, cowslip, elderberry; ginger beer; fortified wines including port and sherry; as well as Robert Waters branded original quinine which was drunk to combat malaria.

As the company quickly expanded, they purchased a 6 acres (2.4 ha) site at Lowesmoor. In 1850 the company built the Great Filling Hall, containing the world's largest vat, which at 12 metres (39 ft) high could hold 521,287 litres (114,667 imp gal; 137,709 US gal) of liquid. For a century this made the works the biggest vinegar works in the world, capable of producing 9,000,000 litres (2,000,000 imp gal; 2,400,000 US gal) of malt vinegar every year.

== Vinegar Works branch ==
As the firm expanded, it was decided that a connection to the national railway network was required via the nearby joint Worcester Shrub Hill railway station of both the Oxford, Worcester and Wolverhampton Railway and the Midland Railway.

The resultant Worcester Railways Act 1870 allowed Hill, Evans and Co to extend the existing branchline that had served the Worcester Engine Works, from where it crossed the Virgin's Tavern Road (now Tolladine Road) by a further 632 yards (578 m) to terminate in St Martin's Street opposite the northern boundary of the vinegar works. This route required a level crossing at Shrub Hill Road, a bridge over the Worcester and Birmingham Canal, and a second level crossing at Pheasant Street. The Act also permitted a second siding to be constructed that was wholly within the parish of St.Martin, which enabled the branchline to connect to both the local flour mill, and the Vulcan Works of engineers McKenzie & Holland.

Completed in 1872, the new private branchline became known as the Vinegar Works branch or the Lowesmoor Tramway. As an engineering company, McKenzie & Holland supplied the required shunting locomotive. From 1903, engineering company Heenan & Froude also built a works in Worcester, which was served by an additional extension. After the closure of the flour mill in 1915, post-World War I that part of the branchline was lifted, and the flour mill and original part of the Vulcan Works redeveloped in the mid-1920s as a bus depot. In 1936, Heenan & Froude took over McKenzie & Holland, and hence responsibility for the supply of the private shunting locomotive.

Post World War II, the Great Western Railway and then British Railways took over supply of the shunting locomotive to the branchline. Supplies to the vinegar works switched to road transport in 1958. The last train on the branchline ran on 5 June 1964, hauled by GWR Pannier Tank engine No.1639. The branchline was taken up from the late 1970s.

== Present ==
The vinegar works closed in 1965. The Great Filling Hall was made a Grade II listed building in 1974. Today it is the local Territorial Army headquarters and training centre. The rest of the buildings on the site were cleared, and the land redeveloped as an Asda supermarket.
