= Toche =

Toche may refer to:

- Toché (footballer), Spanish footballer
- Toche Valley, a valley in Colombia
- Clinopodium macrostemum, a bushy plant
