= Secret Garden distillery =

Gin distillery near Edinburgh, Scotland

Secret Garden Distillery
- Location: 32A Old Pentland Rd, Lothianburn, Edinburgh EH10 7EA, Scotland, United Kingdom
- Coordinates: 55.8845°N 3.1867°W
- Owner: Imogen Armstrong; Isobel Armstrong; Kate Armstrong
- Founded: October 2017; 9 years ago
- Founder: Hamish Martin; Steve Ross
- Status: Operational
- No. of stills: 50 litre alembic 20 litre still
- Website: secretgardendistillery.co.uk

The Secret Garden distillery is a gin distillery in Midlothian, near to Edinburgh. It was founded in 2017 as Old Curiosity distillery, taking on its current name in 2021.

The distillery is open to the public and offers tours and a gin-making experience. In addition to a distillery, the site also operates as a herb garden where botanicals are grown for use in the gins.

== History ==
The company originated as a herb garden project called the Secret Herb Garden, founded by Hamish Martin. Martin had previously worked as a wine merchant and had studied herbology at the Royal Botanic Gardens Edinburgh. The garden was constructed on a derelict 7.5 acre plot of land in 2012. Martin opened a distillery at the site in 2017, then called the Old Curiosity Distillery.

In January 2020, the distillery created an own-label gin for the Balmoral Hotel called Baile Mhoireil. In July, the distillery released a gin in partnership with supermarket Aldi, called Eidyn. This was followed by the release of an alcohol-free gin in August, which used lemon balm, yarrow and calendula.

The distillery and gardens were listed for sale in February 2021. At that time, the gardens and distillery were attracting around 20000 visitors per year. Shortly afterwards, the distillery and gins were rebranded to carry the Secret Garden name. The change of name was intended to emphasise the link between the product and the garden from which the botanicals were sourced.

In August 2022, ownership of the distillery and gardens was taken over by the Armstrong family. At the time of the acquisition the distillery was used mainly for contract-distilling; the new owners released a range of gins centred around juniper, angelica, coriander and winter savoury.

At the start of 2023, space in the gardens was repurposed for juniper trees and for a rose garden, in order to increase supply of botanicals for the gins. Subsequently, in May, the company received a grant from Midlothian Council to drill a borehole 12 metres under the site and build a pumping shed, creating a new water source for the distillery.

The gins were rebranded in April 2024, coinciding with the second anniversary of the acquisition by the Armstrongs. In 2025, the company released three expressions to the French market.

The company was placed into liquidation on 1 July 2026 with special resolution passed that it would be wound up voluntarily. A statement on the distillery’s website reads: “Secret Garden Distillery Limited has entered creditors’ voluntary liquidation and is no longer trading.”

Opus Restructuring also shared a statement: “Upon the cessation of trading, the company’s employees, including the directors, were made redundant. Prior to liquidation the directors had, for some time, been engaging with an interested party with a view to additional investment being made into the business; however, this was ultimately unsuccessful.

“The withdrawal of the interested party and absence of any likely alternative gave rise to the decision that there was no option but to commence liquidation proceedings.”

Filings on Companies House show that Secret Garden’s registered address has been changed from its site on Old Pentland Road on the outskirts of Edinburgh to Opus’ office in Glasgow.
