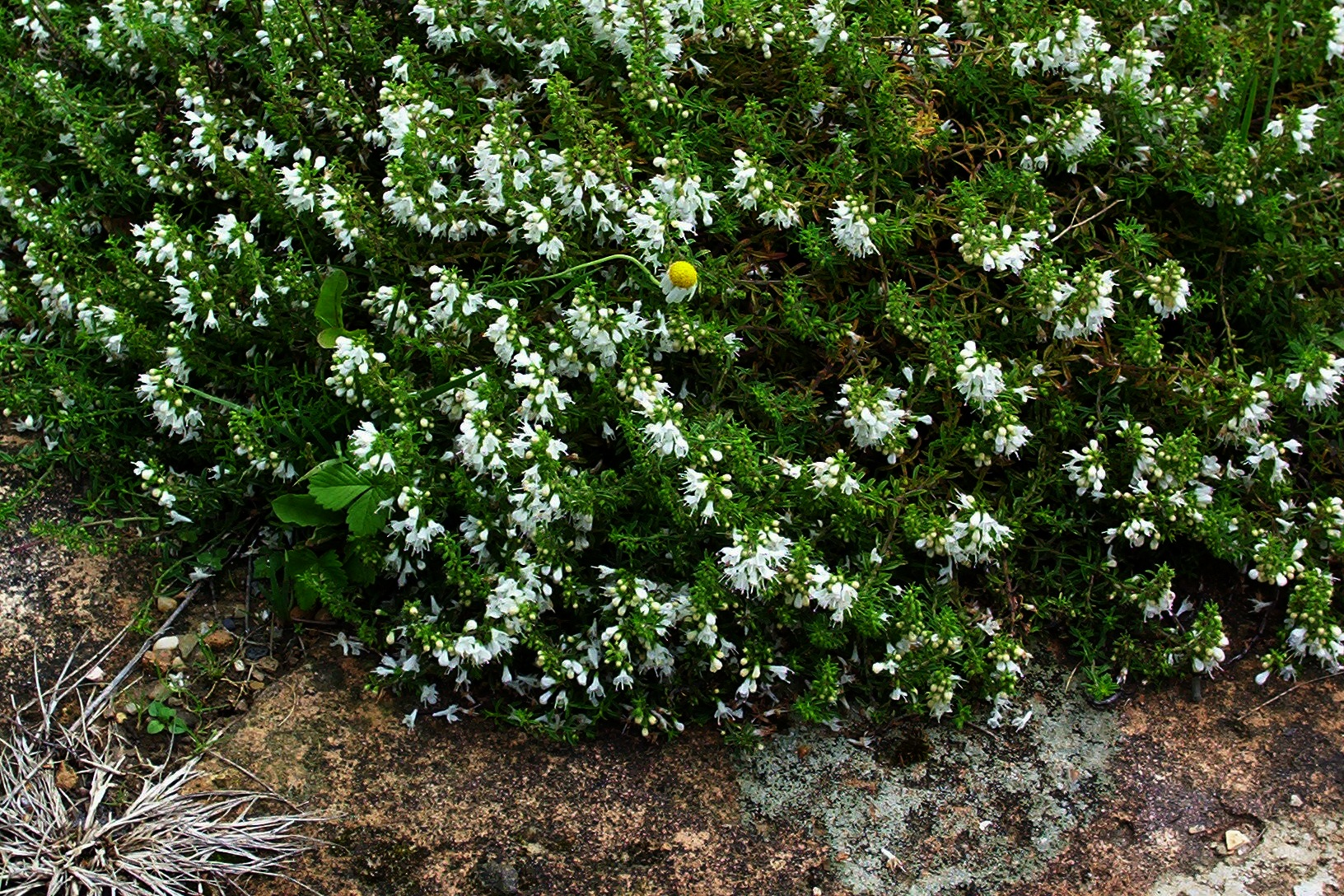
- Habit
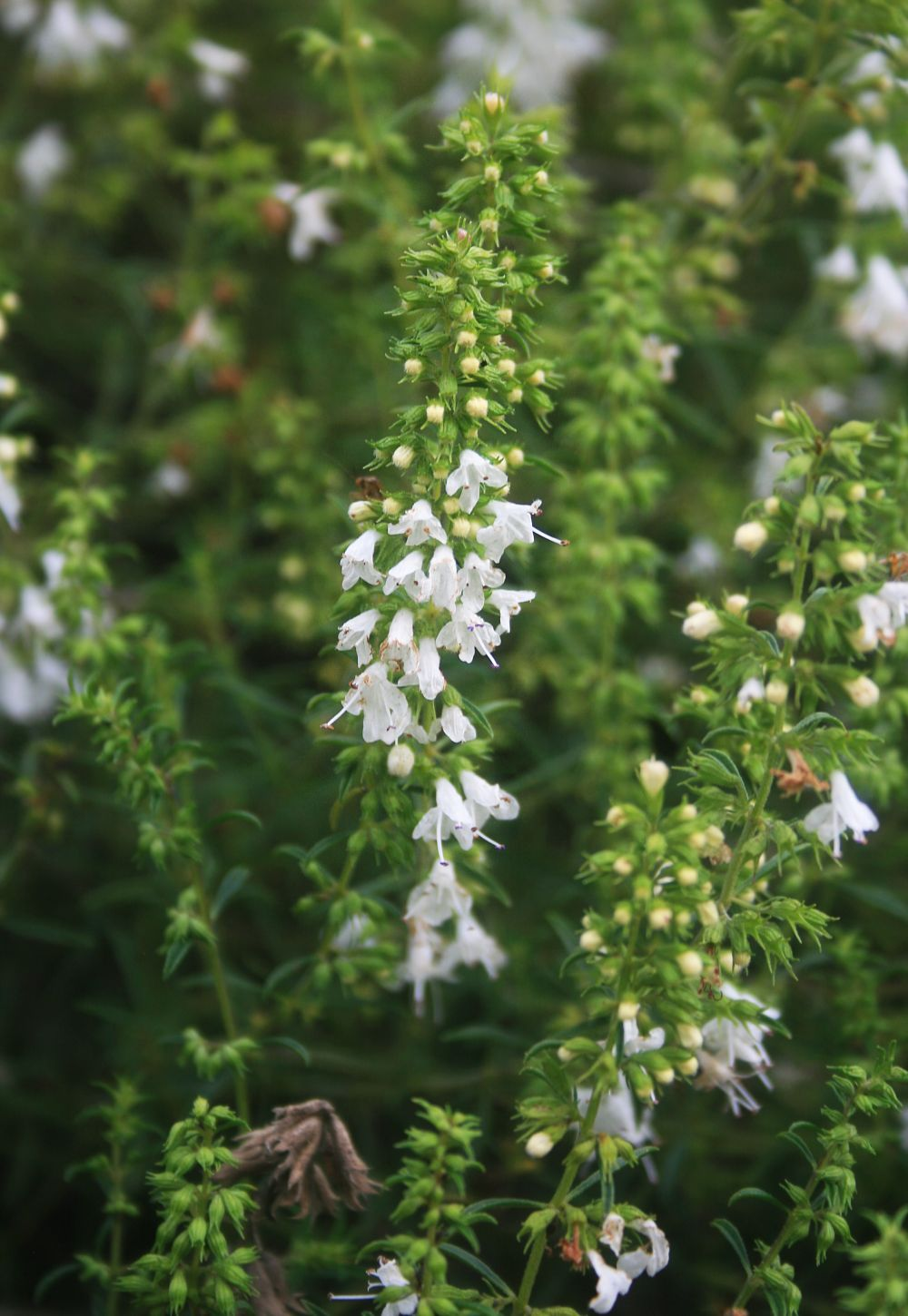
- The specific epithet spicigera means "bearing (flower) spikes".

Scientific classification
- Kingdom: Plantae
- Clade: Tracheophytes
- Clade: Angiosperms
- Clade: Eudicots
- Clade: Asterids
- Order: Lamiales
- Family: Lamiaceae
- Genus: Satureja
- Species: S. spicigera

Binomial name
- Satureja spicigera (K.Koch) Boiss.

Synonyms
- List: Clinopodium alternipilosum (K.Koch) Kuntze; Clinopodium spicigerum (K.Koch) Kuntze; Hyssopus majae A.P.Khokhr.; Micromeria alternipilosa K.Koch; Micromeria spicigera K.Koch; Satureja alternipilosa (K.Koch) K.Koch; Satureja diffusa Benth. ex Boiss.

= Satureja spicigera =

Species of plant in the mint family

Satureja spicigera, or the creeping savory, is a species of flowering plant in the family Lamiaceae. It is native to northeastern Turkey, the Caucasus, and northwestern Iran. A perennial prostrate shrub, hardy in USDA zones 6 through 9, it is recommended as an edging plant for rock and herb gardens. Used as a culinary herb, both fresh and dried, its flavor is similar to winter savory, Satureja montana, though it is stronger than summer savory, Satureja hortensis.
