= Strewing herb =

Plants scattered on floors to improve smell

Strewing herbs are certain kinds of plants that are scattered (strewn) over the floors of dwelling places and other buildings. Such plants usually have fragrant or astringent smells, and many also serve as insecticides or disinfectants. Their use was widespread in England during the Middle Ages through to the 18th century.

== Historical use ==
In the early Middle Ages, bathing had declined in England. As people got smellier, the use of fragrant herbs became more popular. They were used in all areas of the house, including kitchens, dining halls and bedrooms. The herbs were laid on the floor along with reeds, rushes, or straw, so that pleasant odours would be released when people walked on them. Certain plants would also help keep pests such as flea at bay. In a typical medieval English monastery, for instance, the floor of the dormitory would have been strewn with rushes that were swept and replaced once or twice a year.

Rich and poor households used strewing herbs and royal households were no exception. Indeed, Queen Elizabeth I was particularly fond of meadowsweet (Filipendula ulmaria):

'Queene Elizabeth of famous memory, did more desire it than any other herb to strew her chambers withall.'

— John Gerard, Gerard's Herbal

The post of Royal Herb Strewer was created in 1660 by King Charles II.

== List of strewing herbs ==
| Lady's bedstraw | Kills fleas. Also used to stuff mattresses. |
| Sweet flag | Sweet smell. Rush-like leaves. |
| Pennyroyal | Kills fleas (also known as fleabane) and repels ticks. |
| Lavender | Insect repellent (e.g. moths). Also used in mattresses and pillows. |
| Hyssop | Fragrant. Also has biblical reference to cleanliness |
| Mint | Various species |
| meadowsweet (Filipendula ulmaria) | Sweet smell. |
| Chamomile | Insect repellent. |
| Southernwood | Also known as lad's love, this was thought to be an aphrodisiac. Often used in bedrooms. |
| Sweet woodruff | Insect repellent. |
| Thyme | Various species. Insect repellent. |
| Rue | Cat repellent. |
| Rosemary | Often strewn in churches. Kills and repels insects. |
| Rose | Petals only. |
| Camphor laurel | Also known as Mawdelin (from the New Testament episode of the anointing of the feet of Jesus Christ by Mary Magdalen) |
| Cotton lavender | Insect repellent. |
| Sage | Insect repellent. |
| Tansy | Insect repellent. |
Basil
Costmary
Cowslips
Daisies (all kinds of)
| Sweet Fennel | Flea repellent. |
Germander
Marjoram
Oregano
| Sweet maudelin | Insect repellent (moths, lice, and ticks). |
| Winter savory | Insect repellent. |
Hops
Violet
