= Thymus montanus =

Thymus montanus may refer to one of following Lamiaceae species:

- Thymus montanus Waldst. & Kit. (illegitimate), a synonym for Thymus pulegioides (large thyme)
- Thymus montanus (L.) Dum.Cours. (illegitimate), a synonym for Satureja montana
