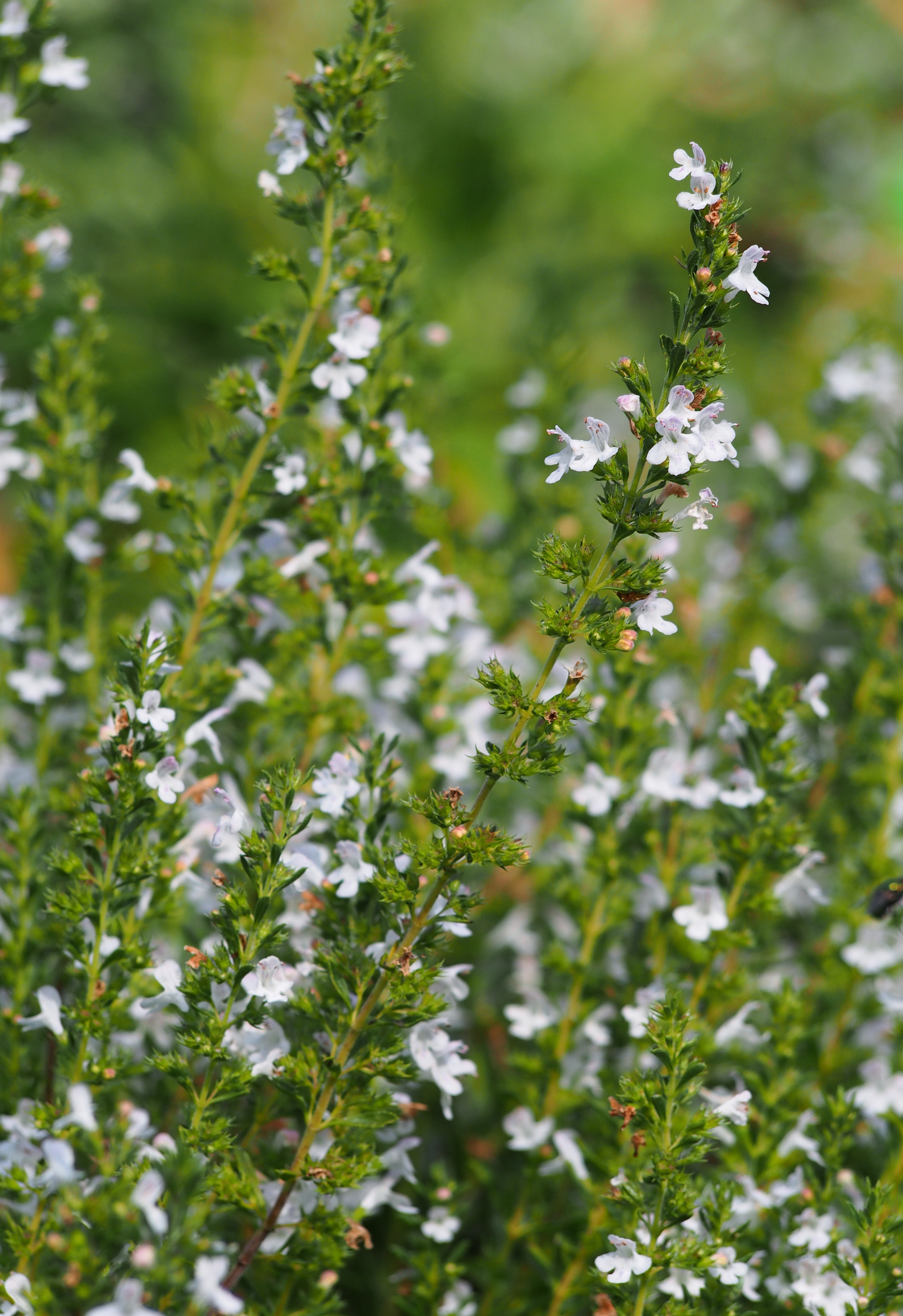
- An atypically pale-flowered specimen

Scientific classification
- Kingdom: Plantae
- Clade: Tracheophytes
- Clade: Angiosperms
- Clade: Eudicots
- Clade: Asterids
- Order: Lamiales
- Family: Lamiaceae
- Genus: Satureja
- Species: S. coerulea

Binomial name
- Satureja coerulea Janka

Synonyms
- Satureja skorpilii Velen.

= Satureja coerulea =

Species of flowering plant

Satureja coerulea, called blue savory, is a species of flowering plant in the genus Satureja, native to Bulgaria, Romania, and Turkey, including East Thrace. A perennial reaching 25 cm, it has gained the Royal Horticultural Society's Award of Garden Merit as an ornamental. It prefers to grow in limestone and granite soils on exposed rocky slopes.
