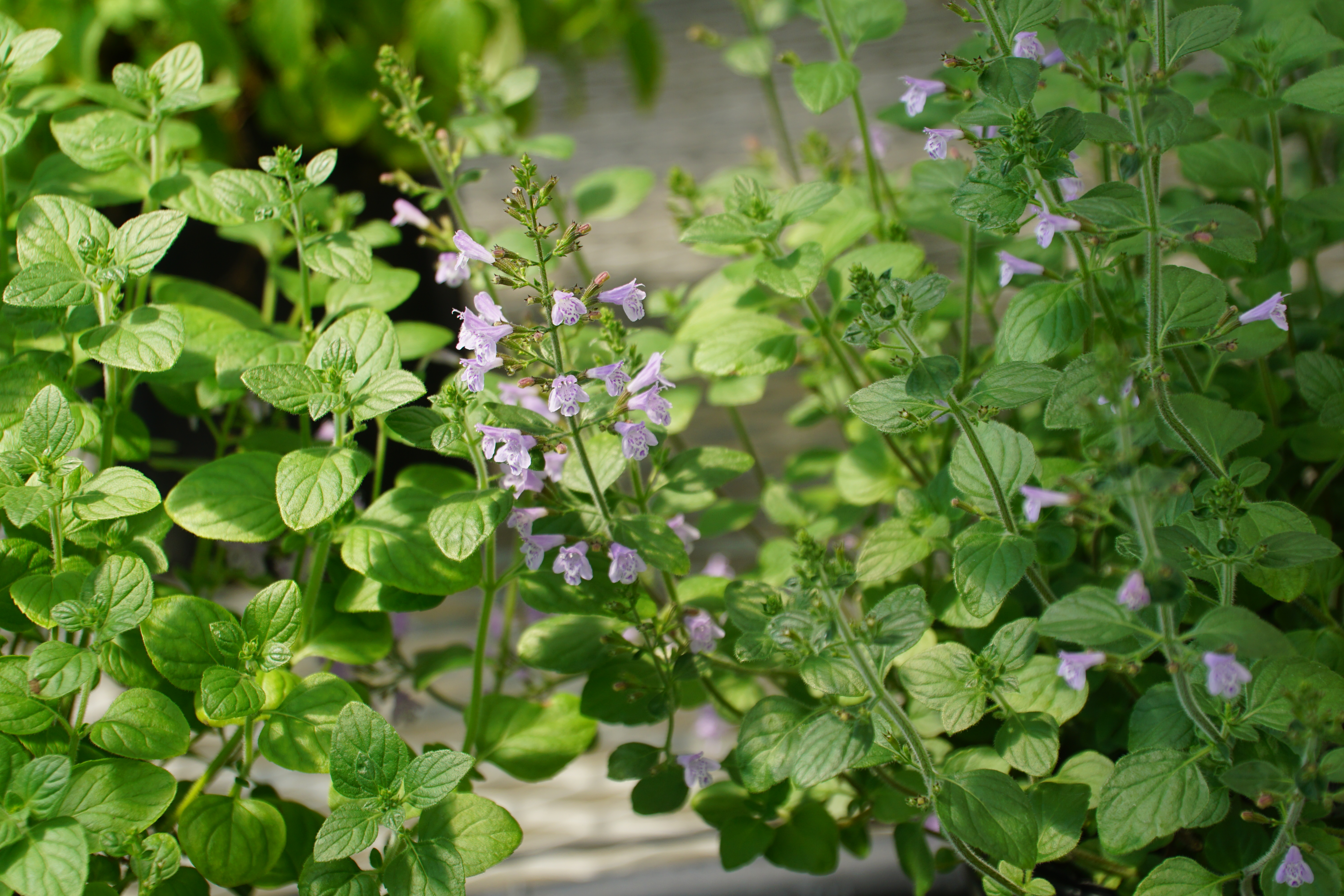

Scientific classification
- Kingdom: Plantae
- Clade: Tracheophytes
- Clade: Angiosperms
- Clade: Eudicots
- Clade: Asterids
- Order: Lamiales
- Family: Lamiaceae
- Genus: Clinopodium
- Species: C. nepeta

Binomial name
- Clinopodium nepeta (L.) Kuntze

Synonyms
- Melissa nepeta L.; Calamintha parviflora Lam., nom. superfl.; Melissa parviflora Salisb., nom. superfl.; Calamintha nepeta (L.) Savi; Thymus nepeta (L.) Sm.; Satureja nepeta (L.) Scheele; Calamintha officinalis var. nepeta (L.) Rchb. & Rchb.f.; Satureja calamintha subsp. nepeta (L.) Briq.

= Clinopodium nepeta =

Lesser calamint

Species of flowering plant

Clinopodium nepeta (synonym: Calamintha nepeta), known as lesser calamint, is a perennial herb of the mint family known for having fragrant, grey-green, oregano-like leaves with a pennyroyal smell. It is also called niepita, and mentuccia romana. This plant commonly grows across the Mediterranean, North Africa and parts of Central Asia and has traditionally been used as a folk medicine and culinary herb. A recent study also found cultivars of lesser catmint that had the same compounds in catnip that cause the euphoric effect in cats, known as nepetalactone.

== Description ==
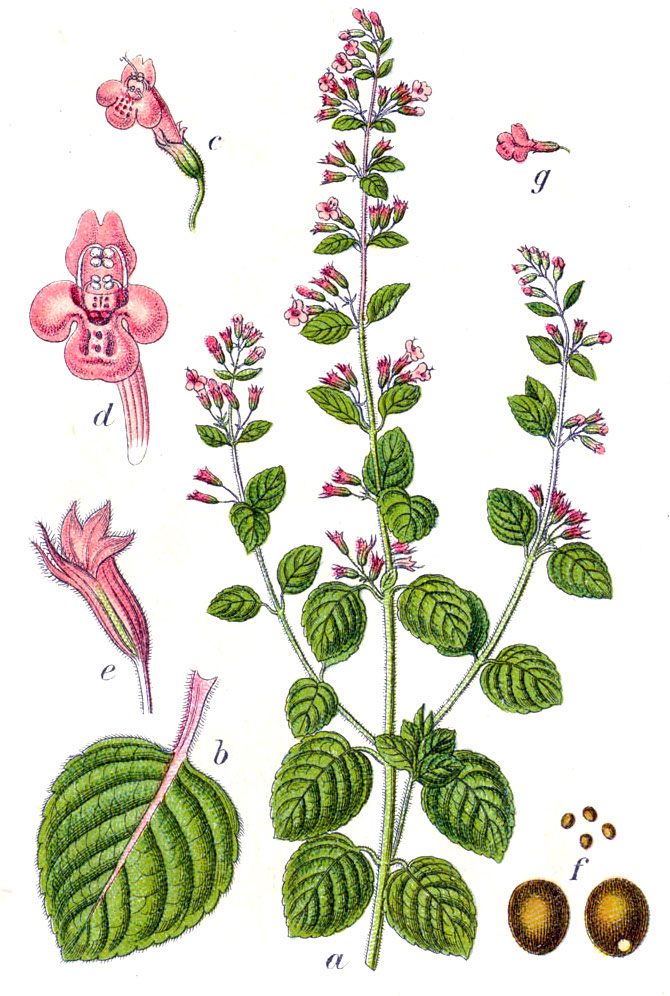
Botanical illustration of Clinopodium nepeta (titled as Thymus nepeta) from Deutschlands Flora in Abbildungen (1796)

Lesser calamint is a perennial shrub, forming a compact mound of shiny green oregano-like leaves. The flowers are lavender pink. The plant reaches a height of 46 centimetres (18 inches). The lesser calamint smells like a cross between mint and oregano. It attracts honeybees and butterflies. Lesser calamint usually grows in the summer and well into the fall. It can become dormant in the winter months then reblossom in spring. In fall the flowers fall to the ground and will self-seed. Seedlings will flower in late August. Lesser calamint often grows wild but can also be kept in pots. The average life expectancy of a plant is 3–4 years. It is susceptible to powdery mildew.

== Taxonomy ==
The species was first described by Carl Linnaeus in 1753 as Melissa nepeta. It was subsequently placed in Calamintha, Thymus, Satureja and Clinopodium, among other genera. The last of these is currently accepted by the World Checklist of Selected Plant Families.

=== Subspecies ===
Three subspecies are recognized:

- Clinopodium nepeta subsp. nepeta – South Central and Southern Europe to Northern Iran
- Clinopodium nepeta subsp. spruneri – Mediterranean to the Caucasus
- Clinopodium nepeta subsp. subisodontum – East Central and Southeast Europe

== Uses ==
Lesser calamint is commonly used as a herb in the Italian and Corsican cuisine, where it is called nepita, mentuccia, nipitella or nepitella. In Rome it is used in the preparation of the Carciofi alla Romana. In southern Italy it is used in the making of a goat cheese called cassiedu, giving the cheese a minty taste. Some sources state that Nepeta nepetella can be used in cooking like the lesser calamint.

C. nepeta has a long history of use as a herbal medicine as a tea for cramps and the digestive tract. Additionally hydrodistilled essential oil made from C. nepeta has been used to alleviate insomnia, headache and respiratory illness

Research has found that extracts of C. nepeta, such as essential oils, have antifungal, insecticidal and insect-repellent properties. Moreover it has recently been discovered that some cultivars of C. nepeta contain nepetalactone, the compound in true catnip famous for the euphoric effect it has on cats. This may also contribute to insect-repellent properties of extracts made from C. nepeta plants.
