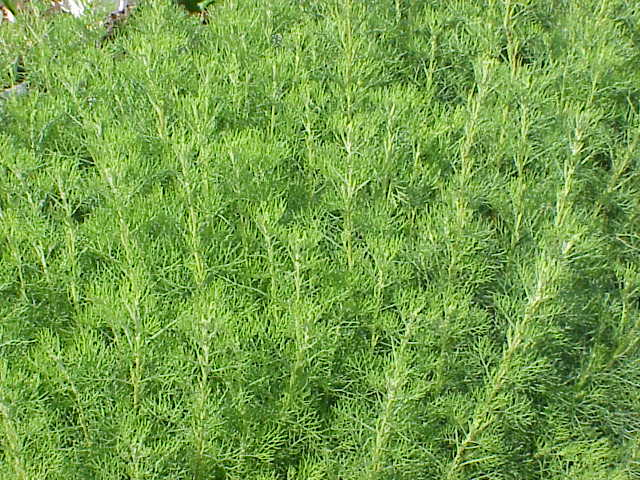

Scientific classification
- Kingdom: Plantae
- Clade: Tracheophytes
- Clade: Angiosperms
- Clade: Eudicots
- Clade: Asterids
- Order: Asterales
- Family: Asteraceae
- Genus: Artemisia
- Species: A. abrotanum

Binomial name
- Artemisia abrotanum L.

Synonyms
- Artemisia altissima Ehrh. ex DC.; Artemisia anethifolia Fisch. ex DC.; Artemisia elatior Klokov; Artemisia elegans Fisch. ex Ledeb.; Artemisia foeniculacea Steven ex DC.; Artemisia herbacea Ehrh. ex Willd.; Artemisia paniculata Lam.; Artemisia procera Willd.; Artemisia proceriformis Krasch.; Artemisia tenuissima Spreng. ex Besser

= Artemisia abrotanum =

Species of plant

Artemisia abrotanum, the southernwood, lad's love, or southern wormwood, is a species of flowering plant in the sunflower family. It is native to Eurasia and Africa but naturalized in scattered locations in North America. Other common names include: old man, boy's love, oldman wormwood, lover's plant, appleringie, garderobe, Our Lord's wood, maid's ruin, garden sagebrush, European sage, sitherwood and lemon plant.

Southernwood has a strong camphor-like odour and was historically used as an air freshener or strewing herb. It forms a small bushy shrub, which is widely cultivated by gardeners. The grey-green leaves are small, narrow and feathery. The small flowers are yellow. It can easily be propagated by cuttings, or by division of the roots.

This plant has gained the Royal Horticultural Society's Award of Garden Merit.

== Description ==
Shrub-like herbaceous perennial in the Asteraceae or daisy family. Possesses upright branches that have greenish gray leaves that form a bushy clumped form. the leaf length is normally 1 - 3 inches and the leaf width is normally less than an inch. It is known for its camphor-like scent. Abrotanum are found mainly in the Baltic states, however have been seen in Eurasia, North America, and Africa. In North America it is becoming a naturalized weed in disturbed areas. They grow best in hot dry climates however they do not succeed in humid weather. They can grow to be 3-4 feet tall and 2-3 feet wide. The flowers can be either white or yellow and they bloom in the summer and the fall. the flower shape is like a cup and is normally less than 1 inch. When the plant is touched it sometimes gives off an aroma of lemon or tangerine and obviously camphor. Artemisia Abrotnum contains a bacteria fighting alkaloid called abrotanin.

== Etymology ==
The genus is named for Artemis who in Greek mythology is the Greek goddess of the moon, wild animals, and hunting. The specific epithet from Greek means wormwood or southernwood which are the most common names for Artemisia abrotanum. Other names could be lad's love, maid's love and old man. In France, it is called garderobe which means guard the wardrobe, referring to the old practice of placing plant sprigs where you would put your clothes to deter moths and other insects. It is called Abroddman or male southernwood and shares its Swedish name with the cotton lavender Santolina chamaecyparissus.

== Uses ==
It has been mentioned as early as the sixteenth century in Swedish Danish medicinal books that it was used as a treatment for people and animals.

A yellow dye can be extracted from the branches of the plant for use with wool. Its dried leaves are used to keep moths away from wardrobes. The volatile oil in the leaves is responsible for the strong, sharp scent which repels moths and other insects. It was customary to lay sprays of the herb amongst clothes, or to hang them in closets, and this is the origin of one of the southernwood's French names, "garderobe" ("clothes-preserver"). Judges carried posies of southernwood and rue to protect themselves from prisoners' contagious diseases, and some church-goers relied on the herb's sharp scent to keep them awake during long sermons.

In the traditional medicine of East and North Bosnia and Herzegovina, aerial parts of Artemisia abrotanum are used in jaundice therapy.

Aqueous extracts of the southernwood have been proven to have benefits to all layers of the skin. Two studies were done to see if southernwood did have the positive benefits, one on dryness in lower legs and the other on multiple factors on in the facial regions. In the first study, the extract was applied to one leg and placebo to the other leg twice a day for two weeks. Moisturization was measured by Skicon, and transepidermal water loss (TEWL) was measured as well. The results showed a significant decrease in TEWL in the panelists with the extract compared to the panelists with placebo. In the second study, patients with coarse wrinkling in the crows feet and upper cheek areas, and also moderate pigmentation, were used. Patients applied the extract to one side of the face and placebo to the other. The facial treatment of southernwood showed improvements of fine lines, mottled pigmentation and radiance when compared to the placebo treatment. The treatment showed significant improvements in overall photodamage to the facial region.

A nasal spray treatment was created to assist patients with allergic rhinitis that contains phytoconstituents 1,8-cineole, linalool, and davonone. Twelve patients that had allergic rhinitis were given the nasal spray, after administration symptoms such as nasal congestion, sneezing and rhinorrhea all declined within 10 minutes and lasted for several hours. However after the nasal spray was used all the patients experienced a stinging sensation in the nasal area, but it did not hinder any of the effects as it only lasted a few seconds.

A poem by Edward Thomas (1878–1917) concerns the herb: "Old Man or Lad's Love".

In the Chinese book of rites, it is mentioned in sacrifices. It was used in bouquets for its fragrance for church women in Sweden. In Medieval books, it is said to have been used to treat sleep talking and female diseases.

== Cultivation ==
Artemisia abrotanum grows in acidic, well-drained soil and prefers loamy, sandy, clay soil to grow to full size. It needs full sun exposure in a sheltered location away from extreme winds. The plant is susceptible to root rot.

== Toxicity ==
In 2012, the European Food Safety Authority reported that all the aerial parts of Artemisia abrotanum contain substances that can be toxic to humans, due to the presence in the essential oil of bicyclic monoterpenes and phenylpropanoids. The severity of poison is low but if eaten in large quantities can be very toxic to humans. The parts of the plant that are poisonous are the bark, flowers, fruits, leaves, roots, seeds, and the stems.
