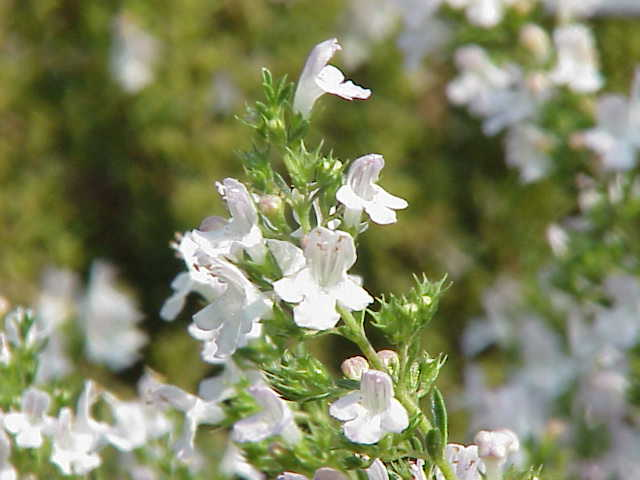
- Winter savory, Satureja montana

Scientific classification
- Kingdom: Plantae
- Clade: Tracheophytes
- Clade: Angiosperms
- Clade: Eudicots
- Clade: Asterids
- Order: Lamiales
- Family: Lamiaceae
- Subfamily: Nepetoideae
- Tribe: Mentheae
- Genus: Satureja; L.

Synonyms
- Thymbra Mill. 1754 not L. 1753; Saturiastrum Fourr.; Euhesperida Brullo & Furnari; Argantoniella G.López & R.Morales

= Satureja =

Genus of flowering plants

Satureja is a genus of aromatic plants of the family Lamiaceae, related to rosemary and thyme. It is native to southern and southeastern Europe, North Africa, the Middle East, and Central Asia. Historically, Satureja was defined broadly and many species of the subtribe Menthinae from throughout the world were included in it. In the modern cladistic era of botany, Satureja was redefined to a narrower monophyletic genus whose species are all native to Eurasia. Several species are cultivated as culinary herbs called savory, and they have become established in the wild in a few places.

== Description ==
Satureja species may be annual or perennial. They are low-growing herbs and subshrubs, reaching heights of 15–50 cm (5.9–19.7 in).

The leaves are 1–3 cm (0.39–1.18 in) long, with flowers forming in whorls on the stem, white to pale pink-violet.

== Ecology and cultivation ==
Satureja species are food plants for the larva of some Lepidoptera (butterflies and moths). Caterpillars of the moth Coleophora bifrondella feed exclusively on winter savory (S. montana).

Savory may be grown purely for ornamental purposes; members of the genus need sun and well-drained soil.

== Uses ==
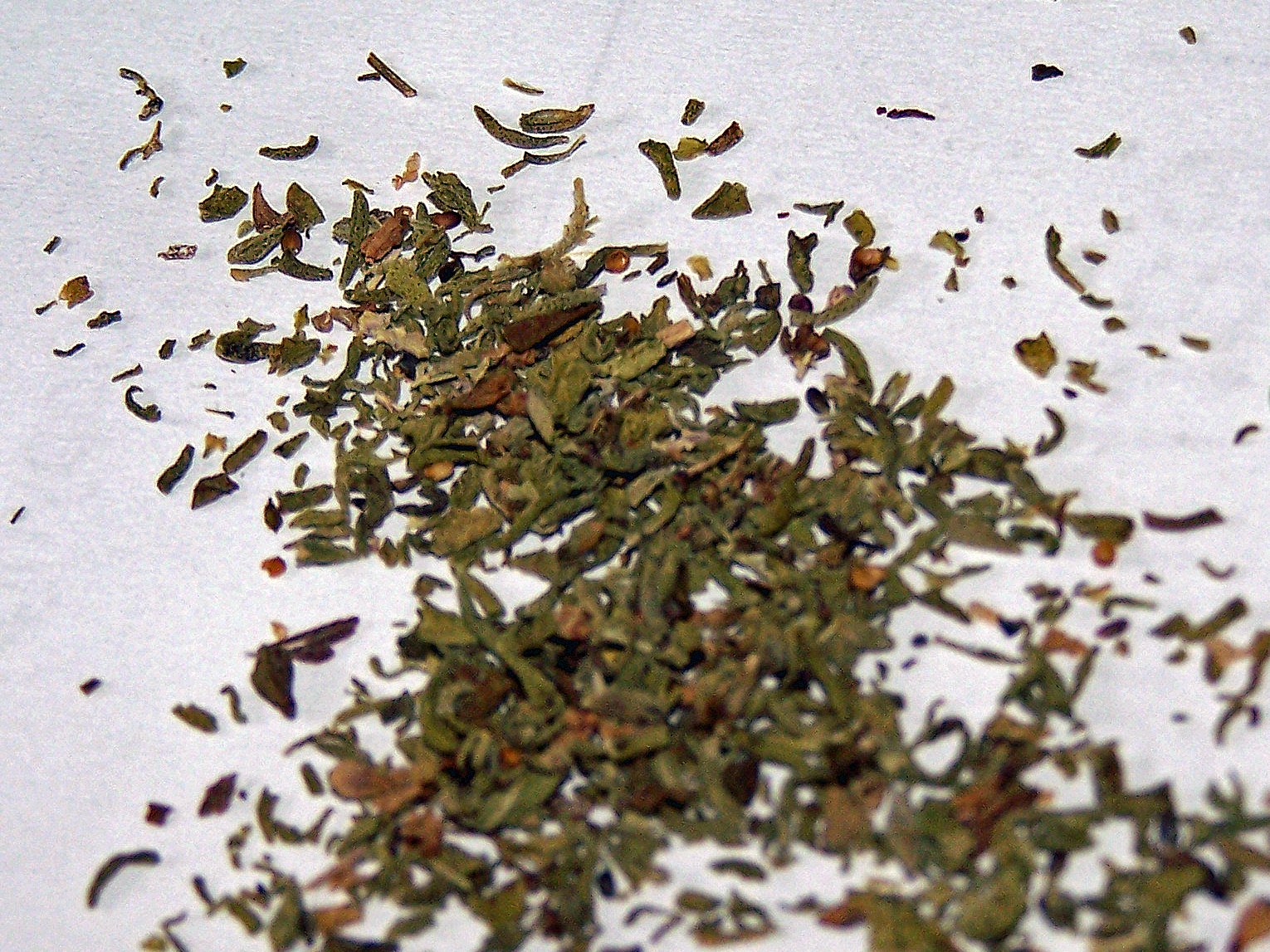
Dried summer savory leaves

Both summer savory (Satureja hortensis) and winter savory (Satureja montana) are used to flavor food. The former is preferred by cooks but as an annual is only available in summer; winter savory is an evergreen perennial.

Savory plays an important part in Persian, Armenian, Georgian, Bulgarian and Italian cuisine, particularly when cooking beans. It is also used to season the traditional Acadian stew known as fricot. The modern spice mixture Herbes de Provence has savory as one of the principal ingredients.

In Azerbaijan, savory is often incorporated as a flavoring in black tea.

== Species ==
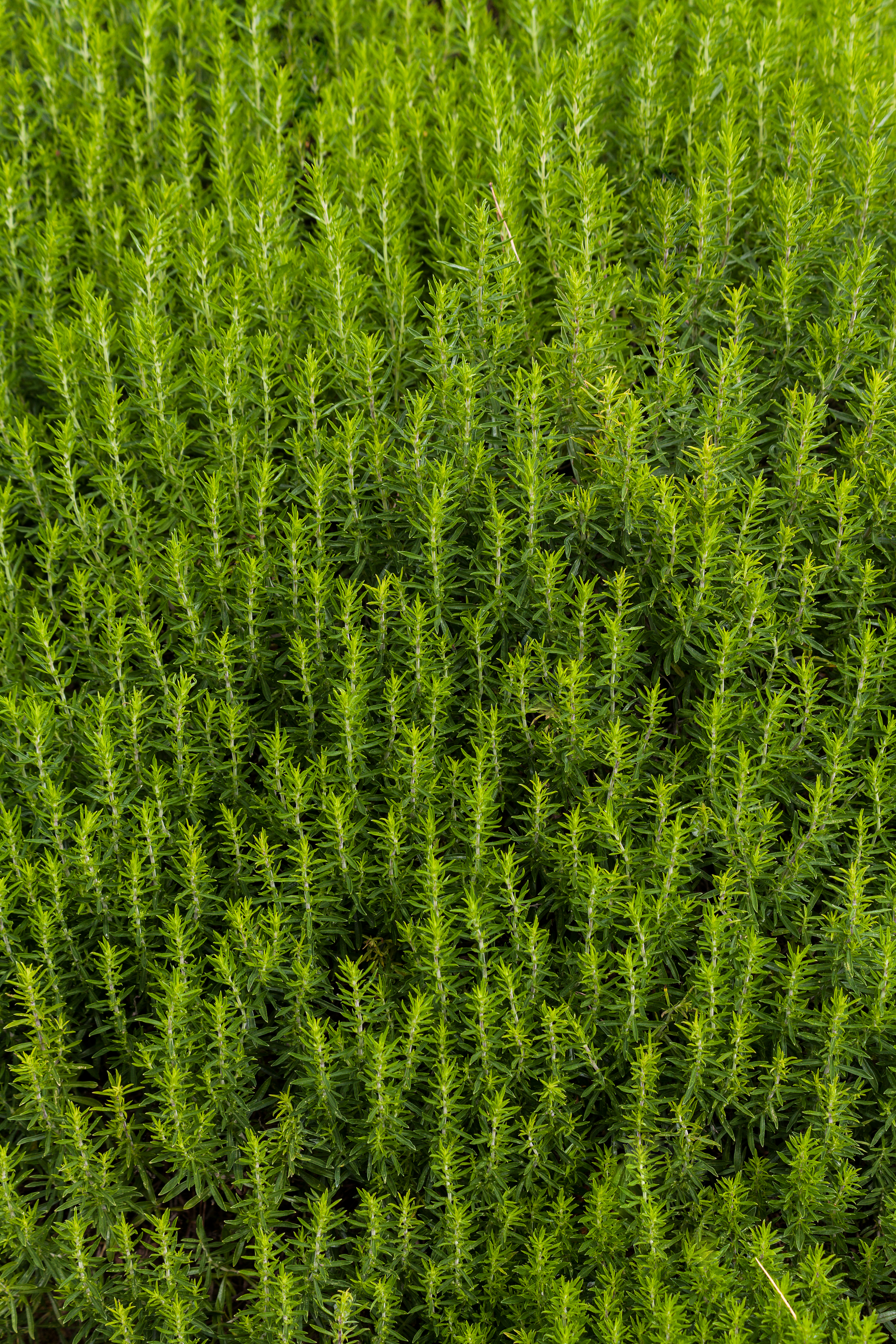
Satureja subspicata

- Satureja adamovicii Šilic – Balkans
- Satureja aintabensis P.H.Davis – Turkey
- Satureja amani P.H.Davis – Turkey
- Satureja atropatana Bunge – Iran
- Satureja avromanica Maroofi – Iran
- Satureja bachtiarica Bunge – Iran
- Satureja boissieri Hausskn. ex Boiss. – Turkey, Iran
- Satureja bzybica Woronow – Caucasus
- Satureja × caroli-paui G.López – Spain (S. innota × S. montana)
- Satureja cilicica P.H.Davis – Turkey
- Satureja coerulea Janka – Bulgaria, Romania, Turkey
- Satureja cuneifolia Ten – Spain, Italy, Greece, Albania, Yugoslavia, Iraq
- Satureja × delpozoi Sánchez-Gómez, J.F.Jiménez & R.Morales – Spain (S. cuneifolia × S. intricata var. gracilis)
- Satureja edmondii Briq. – Iran
- Satureja × exspectata G.López – Spain (S. intricata var. gracilis × S. montana)
- Satureja fukarekii Šilic – Yugoslavia
- Satureja hellenica Halácsy – Greece
- Satureja hortensis L. – summer savory – Italy, Bulgaria, Albania, Yugoslavia, Crimea, Caucasus, Altai Republic, Kazakhstan, Xinjiang, western Himalayas; naturalized in western Mediterranean, Persian Gulf sheikdoms, Cuba, Dominican Republic, scattered locations in United States
  - The heterogeneous mixture of the Satureja hortensis L. essential oil in water serves as a natural herbicide. The addition of this mixture inhibits the root elongation of weeds which reduces the weed's root-to-shoot ratio. This further reduces the weed's cell division and inhibits its germination, growth, and physiological processes.
- Satureja horvatii Šilic – Greece, Yugoslavia
- Satureja icarica P.H.Davis – Greek Islands
- Satureja innota (Pau) Font Quer – Spain
- Satureja intermedia C.A.Mey. – Iran, Caucasus
- Satureja intricata Lange – Spain
- Satureja isophylla Rech.f. – Iran
- Satureja kallarica Jamzad – Iran
- Satureja kermanshahensis Jamzad – Iran
- Satureja khuzistanica Jamzad – Iran
- Satureja kitaibelii Wierzb. ex Heuff. – Bulgaria, Romania, Yugoslavia
- Satureja laxiflora K.Koch – Iran, Iraq, Turkey, Caucasus
- Satureja linearifolia (Brullo & Furnari) Greuter – Cyrenaica region of Libya
- Satureja macrantha C.A.Mey. – Iran, Iraq, Turkey, Caucasus
- Satureja metastasiantha Rech.f. – Iraq
- Satureja montana L. – winter savory – southern Europe, Turkey, Syria
- Satureja mutica Fisch. & C.A.Mey. – Caucasus, Iran, Turkmenistan
- Satureja nabateorum Danin & Hedge – Jordan
- Satureja × orjenii Šilic – Yugoslavia (S. horvatii × S. montana)
- Satureja pallaryi J.Thiébaut – Syria
- Satureja parnassica Heldr. & Sart. ex Boiss. – Greece, Turkey
- Satureja pilosa Velen. – Italy, Greece, Bulgaria
- Satureja rumelica Velen. – Bulgaria
- Satureja sahendica Bornm. – Iran
- Satureja salzmannii (Kuntze) P.W.Ball – Morocco, Spain
- Satureja spicigera (K.Koch) Boiss. – Turkey, Iran, Caucasus
- Satureja spinosa L. – Turkey, Greek Islands including Crete
- Satureja subspicata Bartl. ex Vis. – Austria, Yugoslavia, Albania, Bulgaria, Italy
- Satureja taurica Velen. – Crimea
- Satureja thymbra L. – Libya, southeastern Europe from Sardinia to Turkey; Cyprus, Lebanon, Palestine
- Satureja thymbrifolia Hedge & Feinbrun – Israel-Palestine, Saudi Arabia
- Satureja visianii Šilic. – Yugoslavia
- Satureja wiedemanniana (Avé-Lall.) Velen. – Turkey

=== Formerly in Satureja ===
- Browne's savory, Clinopodium brownei (as Satureja brownei)
- San Miguel Savory, Clinopodium chandleri (as Satureja chandleri)
- Large-flowered calamint, Clinopodium grandiflorum (as Satureja grandiflora)
- Stone mint, Cunila mariana (as Satureja origanoides)
- Satureja acinos (L.) Scheele = Clinopodium acinos (L.) Kuntze
- Satureja alpina (L.) Scheele = Clinopodium alpinum (L.) Kuntze
- Satureja biflora (Buch.-Ham. ex D.Don) Benth = Micromeria biflora (Buch.-Ham. ex D.Don) Benth
- Satureja gilliesii (Graham) Briq. = Clinopodium chilense (Benth.) Govaerts
- Satureja mexicana (Benth.) Briq. = Clinopodium mexicanum (Benth.) Govaerts
- Satureja multiflora (Ruiz & Pav.) Briq. – Chilean shrub mint = Clinopodium multiflorum (Ruiz & Pav.) Kuntze
- Satureja palmeri (A.Gray) Briq. (believed extinct; rediscovered 2001) = Clinopodium palmeri (A.Gray) Kuntze
- Satureja paradoxa (Vatke) Engl. ex Seybold = Clinopodium paradoxum (Vatke) Ryding
- Satureja robusta (Hook.f) Brenan = Clinopodium robustum (Hook.f) Ryding
- Satureja viminea L. – serpentine savory = Clinopodium vimineum (L.) Kuntze
- Satureja vulgaris (L.) Fritschl = Clinopodium vulgare L.
- Satureja vernayana Brenan = Clinopodium vernayanum (Brenan) Ryding
- Satureja douglasii (Benth.) Briq. – yerba buena (syn. S. chamissonis) = Micromeria douglasii Benth

== Etymology ==
The etymology of the Latin word "satureia" is unclear. Speculation that it is related to saturare, to satyr, or to za'atar is not well supported. The ancient Hebrew name is Tzatrah צתרה.
