= Clinopodium hintoniorum =

Scientific classification
- Kingdom: Plantae
- Clade: Tracheophytes
- Clade: Angiosperms
- Clade: Eudicots
- Clade: Asterids
- Order: Lamiales
- Family: Lamiaceae
- Genus: Clinopodium
- Species: C. hintoniorum

Binomial name
- Clinopodium hintoniorum (B.L.Turner) Govaerts

Synonyms
- Satureja hintoniorum B.L.Turner

Species of plant

Clinopodium hintoniorum is a plant native to Mexico in the genus Clinopodium.

== Description ==
This species is a small subshrub with brittle leaves with small hairs and shredding bark. The flowers are purplish and mint-like.

== Illustration ==
This species is illustrated in Turners works in great detail, unlike many of his other descriptions, as cited here.
