= Clinopodium chilense =

Scientific classification
- Kingdom: Plantae
- Clade: Tracheophytes
- Clade: Angiosperms
- Clade: Eudicots
- Clade: Asterids
- Order: Lamiales
- Family: Lamiaceae
- Genus: Clinopodium
- Species: C. chilense

Binomial name
- Clinopodium chilense (Benth.) Govaerts

Synonyms
- Gardoquia chilensis Benth.; Gardoquia gilliesii Graham; Satureja chilensis (Benth.) Briq.; Satureja gilliesii (Graham) Briq.

Species of plant

Clinopodium chilense, synonyms including Satureja gilliesii, is a plant in the family Lamiaceae (the mint family). C. chilense is endemic to central Chile. It is found in the La Campana National Park area, in association with the endangered Chilean wine palm, Jubaea chilensis.

== Taxonomy ==
Clinopodium chilense was first described as Gardoquia chilensis by George Bentham in 1832. It was transferred to Satureja by John Isaac Briquet in 1898, and then to Clinopodium by Rafaël Govaerts in 1999. Robert Graham had previously described Gardoquia gilliesii in 1831, which in 1896 Briquet had also transferred to Satureja. Satureja gilliesii is considered to be a synonym of Clinopodium chilense. The two cannot be united under the name "Clinopodium gilliesii", although the epithet gilliesii is earlier, because the combination Clinopodium gilliesii had already been published by Kuntze in 1891 for a different species.
