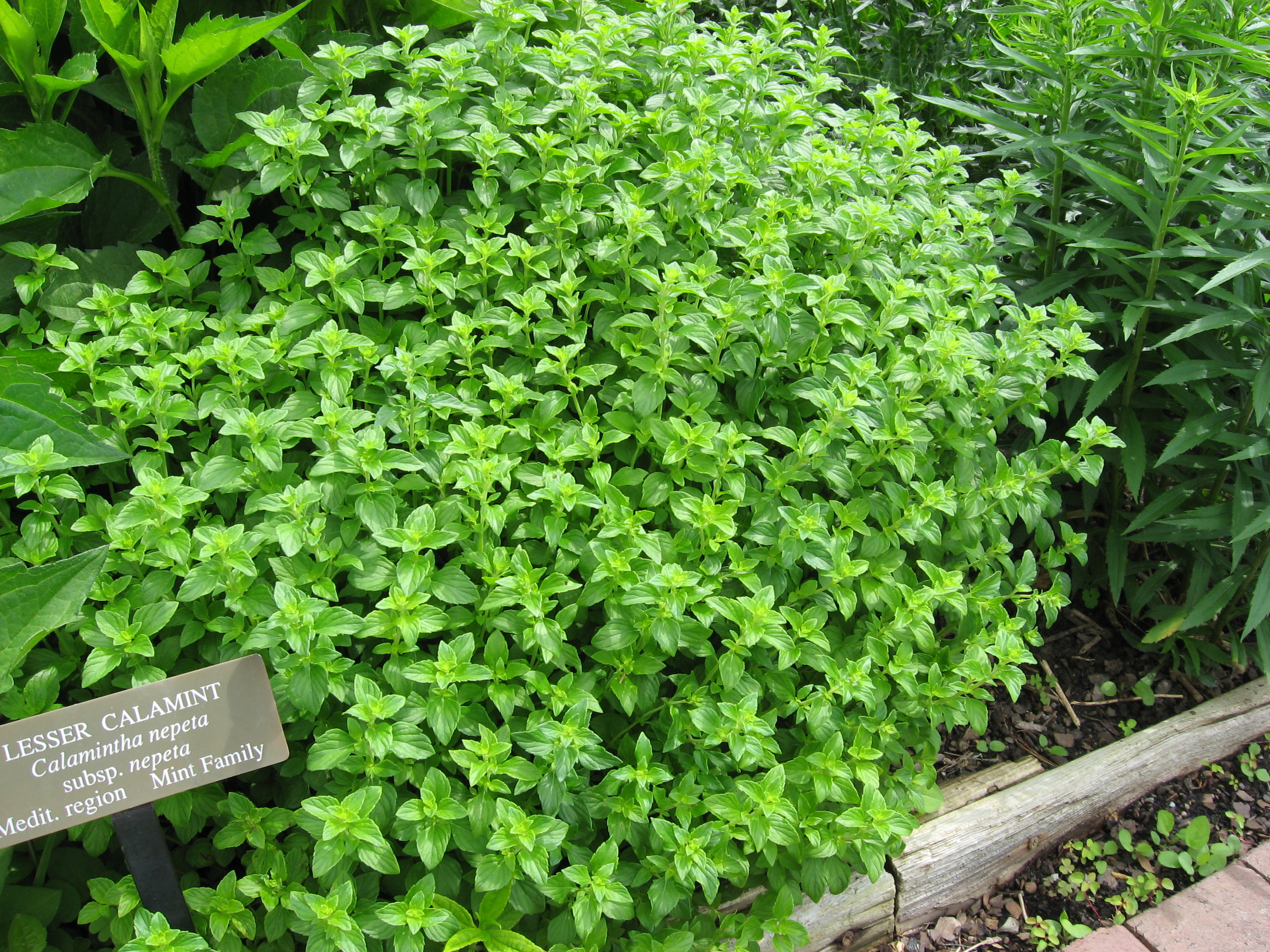

Scientific classification
- Kingdom: Plantae
- Clade: Tracheophytes
- Clade: Angiosperms
- Clade: Eudicots
- Clade: Asterids
- Order: Lamiales
- Family: Lamiaceae
- Genus: Clinopodium
- Species: C. nepeta (L.) Kuntze
- Subspecies: C. n. subsp. nepeta

Trinomial name
- Clinopodium nepeta subsp. nepeta

Synonyms
- List: Acinos transsilvanica Schur; Calamintha acinifolia Sennen; Calamintha alboi Sennen; Calamintha athonica Rchb.; Calamintha barolesii Sennen; Calamintha bonanovae Sennen; Calamintha bonanovae Sennen & Pau; Calamintha brevisepala Sennen; Calamintha caballeroi Sennen & Pau; Calamintha cacuminiglabra Sennen; Calamintha cantabrica Sennen & Elías; Calamintha dilatata Schrad.; Calamintha dufourii Sennen; Calamintha enriquei Sennen & Pau; Calamintha eriocaulis Sennen; Calamintha ferreri Sennen; Calamintha gillesii Sennen; Calamintha guillesii Sennen, orth. var.; Calamintha josephi Sennen; Calamintha largiflora Klokov; Calamintha litardierei Sennen; Calamintha longiracemosa Sennen; Calamintha mollis Jord. ex Lamotte; Calamintha nepeta var. athonica (Rchb.) K.Koch; Calamintha nepeta var. canescens Magnier; Calamintha nepeta subsp. gussonei Tod. ex Nyman, nom. nud.; Calamintha nepeta var. hirsutissima Pant.; Calamintha nepeta var. mollis (Jord. ex Lamotte) Nyman; Calamintha nepeta var. nepetoides (Jord.) Nyman; Calamintha nepetoides Jord.; Calamintha obliqua Host; Calamintha officinalis subsp. nepetoides (Jord.) Arcang.; Calamintha peniciliata Sennen; Calamintha rotundifolia Host; Calamintha sennenii Cadevall; Calamintha suavis Sennen; Calamintha thessala Hausskn.; Calamintha transsilvanica (Jáv.) Soó; Calamintha trichotoma Moench; Calamintha vulgaris Clairv.; Clinopodium jordanii Melnikov; Clinopodium largiflorum (Klokov) Melnikov; Clinopodium nepetoides (Jord.) Melnikov; Clinopodium thessalum (Hausskn.) Melnikov; Melissa aetheos Benth.; Melissa obtusifolia Pers.; Micromeria byzantina Walp.; Micromeria canescens Walp., nom. illeg.; Satureja brauneana var. transsilvanica Jáv.; Satureja calamintha var. mollis (Jord. ex Lamotte) Briq.; Satureja calamintha var. nepetoides (Jord.) Briq.; Satureja calamintha subsp. officinalis Gams; Satureja mollis (Jord. ex Lamotte) E.P.Perrier; Satureja nepetoides (Jord.) Fritsch; Thymus athonicus Bernh. ex Rchb.; Thymus minor Trevir.

= Clinopodium nepeta subsp. nepeta =

Subspecies of flowering plant

Clinopodium nepeta subsp. nepeta is a subspecies of flowering plants in the family Lamiaceae. It is native to Europe (Austria, Switzerland, Albania, Greece, Italy, Corsica, France, Spain) and eastwards to Turkey, Lebanon and Syria, Iran and the Transcaucasus. It has been introduced elsewhere in the world, including parts of North America and New Zealand.
