= Cowslip wine =

Flower wine

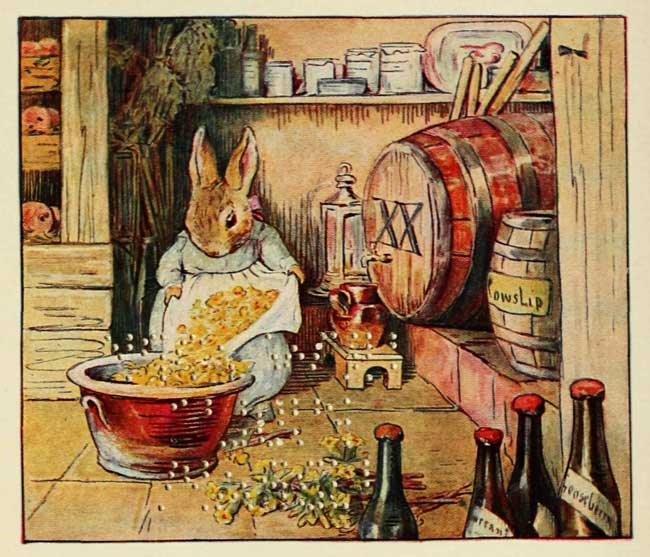
Beatrix Potter's character Cecily Parsley prepares cowslip wine

Cowslip wine is a fermented drink made from the pips (flowers) of Primula veris, cowslip.

== History ==
The English historian Dorothy Hartley reports that historically, cowslip wine was sold "by the pint" at the Old Market Square in Nottingham. Recipes for cowslip wine appeared in British cookbooks from at least the 17th century. John Evelyn includes a preparation in Acetaria: A Discourse of Sallets (1699) by John Evelyn; as does Hannah Glasse (1747) under the title "To make Cowslip or Clary Wine." Elizabeth Moxon (1764) includes multiple recipes, adding brandy to "Cowslip Wine another Way" and comments "This is right good." Recipes for cowslip wine also appear in several manuscript cookbooks compiled by English women of the period, including in the works of Anne Blencowe and Rebecca Price. Blencowe's manuscript gives two recipes—the first, credited to a "Lady Power" reads as follows:

To every gallon of water take 2 pounds of sugar & lett them boyle one Hour together. Scum it & stran it off; order it as you do wort; when it is cold enough, put to every gallon of water one spoon full of yeast & when it is a little white put it into your vessell & to every gallon put 6 or 7 quarts of picked cowslips & ye juce of 2 or 3 lemons & ye pell of some of them. The cowslips must be stirred 3 days befor you stop it close, & when it is stopped close let it stand 3 weeks or a month. Before you bottle it put in a lump of sugar. This is approv'd.

These recipes were often used as the basis for a number of other flower wines, includes those using peonies and hawthorn. Recipes for cowslip wine also appeared in multiple recipes books in the Colony of Virginia, including in Martha Washington's Booke of Cookery.

In the Victorian era, consumption of cowslip wine declined as flower cookery fell from favour. One place it did continue was in the English country, where cooks continued to include flower recipes in their cookbooks into the 20th century. The author Beatrix Potter, who covered the British country as her subject, includes cowslip wine in several works. In her 1922 book Cecily Parsley's Nursery Rhymes, Potter includes an image of her character Cecily Parsley preparing cowslip wine. The image was a modification of a 1905 image of Cecily Parsley, where instead of processing cowslip into wine she was processing apples into cider. The change was made at the insistence of her publishers, who thought cowslip wine more appropriate to an audience of children.

For much of its history, cowslip wine was made with cowslip that grew wild in the British countryside. By the 2000s, however, the plant was rare and protected, and winemakers use the flowers of plants purchased at nurseries.

== Taste and appearance ==
Cowslip wine has a rich flavour, with an appearance described by the writer George Borrow as "pale and delicate". Edward Smith, writing in 1883 mentions cowslip wine in speaking of country wines generally, calling it weak and in need of brandy.

A cookbook 1870 advises serving "cowslip wine and sugar" with its "Gotham Pudding", a steamed pudding that had candied lemon peel incorporated into its batter.

== See also ==
- Fruit wine
- Osmanthus wine

== Sources ==
- Bissell, Frances (2012) [2007]. The Scented Kitchen: Cooking with Flowers (Expanded ed.). London: Serif. ISBN 978-1-897959-54-1.
- Glasse, Hannah (1747). The Art of Cookery Made Plain and Easy (1st ed.). London: Hannah Glasse.
- Harbury, Katharine E. (2004). Colonial Virginia's Cooking Dynasty. Columbia, South Carolina: University of South Carolina Press. ISBN 1-57003-513-X.
- Hartley, Dorothy (1996) [1954]. Food in England. London: Little, Brown and Company. ISBN 0-316-87900-2.
- Hess, Karen (1981). Martha Washington's Booke of Cookery. New York: Columbia University Press. ISBN 0-231-04930-7.
- Hobbs, Anne Stevenson (1989). Beatrix Potter's Art: Paintings And Drawings. London: Penguin. ISBN 0-7232-3598-8.
- Hughes, Glyn (2017). The Lost Foods of England. Winster, Derbyshire: Lulu Press. ISBN 978-0-244-02963-0.
- Masson, Madeleine (1974). The Compleat Cook, or, The Secrets of a Seventeenth-Century Housewife. London: Routledge & Kegan Paul. ISBN 0-7100-7444-1.
- Smith, Edward (2011) [1883]. Foods. New York: Taylor & Francis. ISBN 978-0-7103-1138-2.
- Stapley, Christina (2004). The Receipt Book of Lady Ann Blencowe: Seventeenth Century Cookery and Home Medicine. Basingstoke, Hampshire: Heartsease Books. ISBN 0-9522336-5-7.
