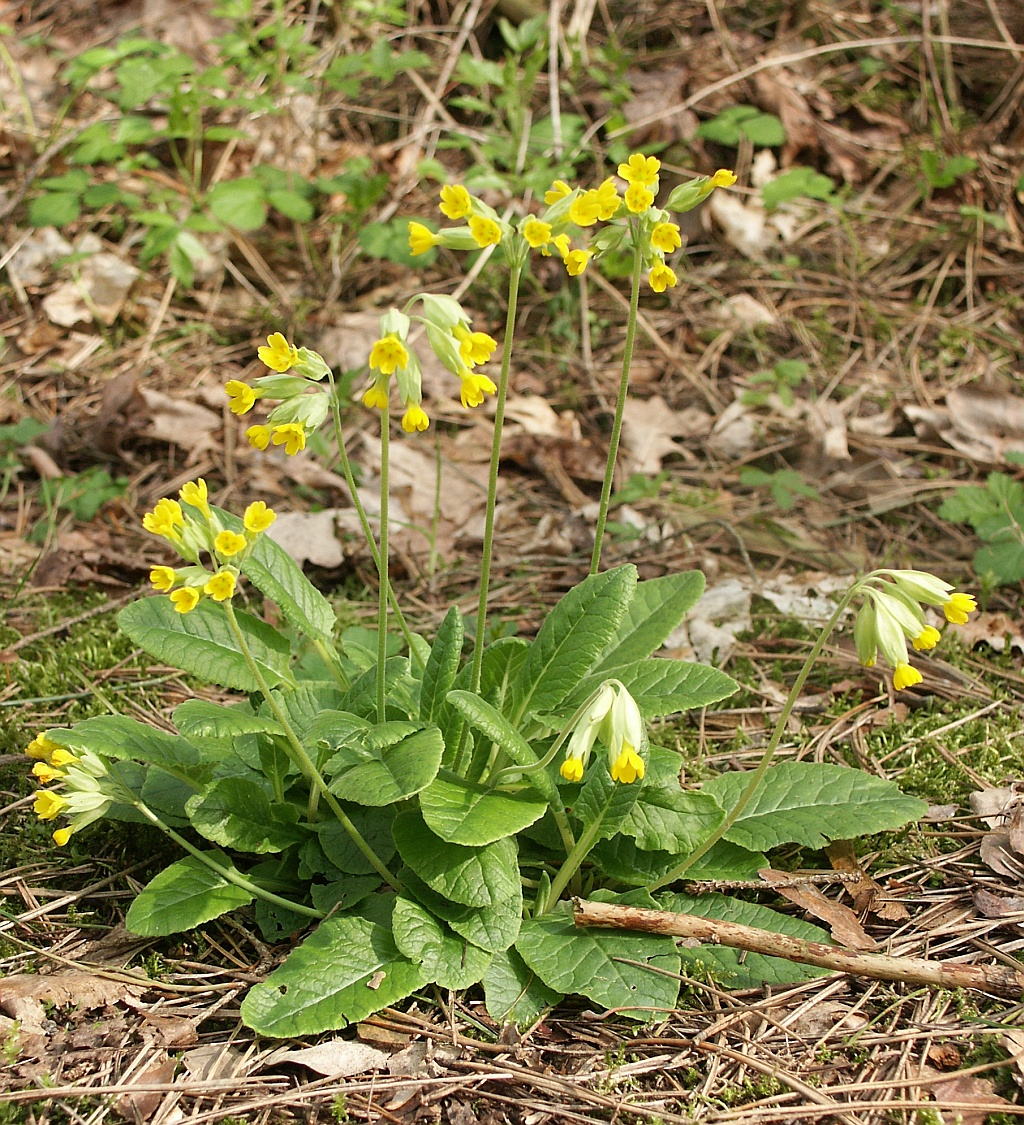

Scientific classification
- Kingdom: Plantae
- Clade: Tracheophytes
- Clade: Angiosperms
- Clade: Eudicots
- Clade: Asterids
- Order: Ericales
- Family: Primulaceae
- Genus: Primula
- Species: P. veris

Binomial name
- Primula veris L.

Subspecies
- Primula veris subsp. macrocalyx

= Primula veris =

Species of flowering plant

Primula veris, the cowslip, common cowslip, or cowslip primrose (syn. Primula officinalis Hill), is a herbaceous perennial flowering plant in the primrose family Primulaceae. The species is native throughout most of temperate Europe and western Asia, and although absent from more northerly areas including much of northwest Scotland, it reappears in northernmost Sutherland and Orkney and in Scandinavia. This species frequently hybridizes with other Primulas such as the common primrose Primula vulgaris to form false oxlip (Primula × polyantha) which is often confused with true oxlip (Primula elatior), a much rarer plant.

== Names ==
The common name cowslip may derive from the old English for cow dung, probably because the plant was often found growing amongst the manure in cow pastures. An alternative derivation simply refers to slippery or boggy ground; again, a typical habitat for this plant. The name "cowslop" derived from Old English still exists in some dialects, but the politer-sounding "cowslip" became standard in the 16th century.

The species name veris ('of spring', referring to the season) is the genitive case form of Latin ver ('spring'). However, primrose P. vulgaris, flowers earlier, from December to May in the British Isles.

Other historical common names include cuy lippe, herb peter, paigle or pagil, peggle, key flower, key of heaven, fairy cups, petty mulleins, crewel, buckles, palsywort, and plumrocks.

== Description ==
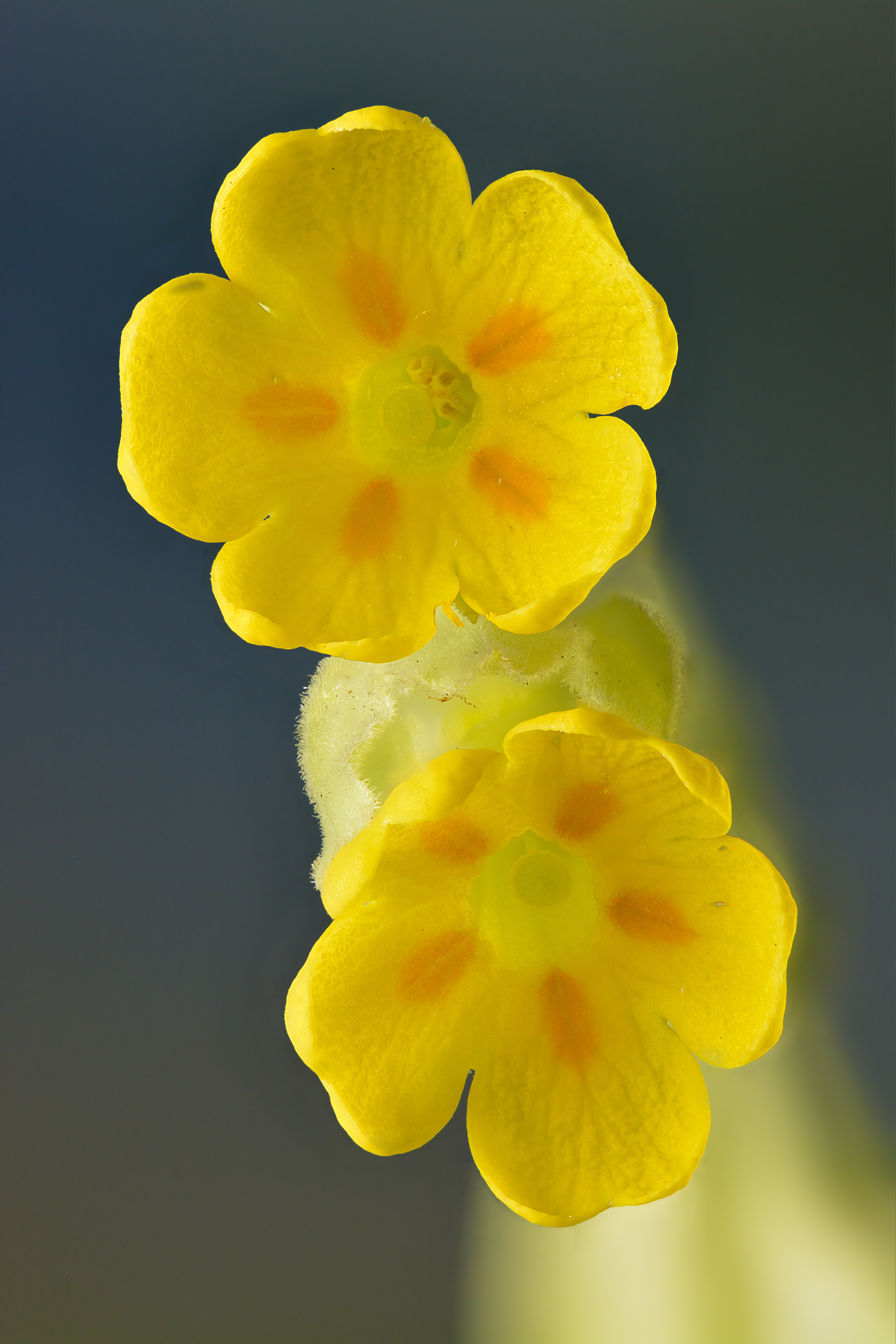
Flowers

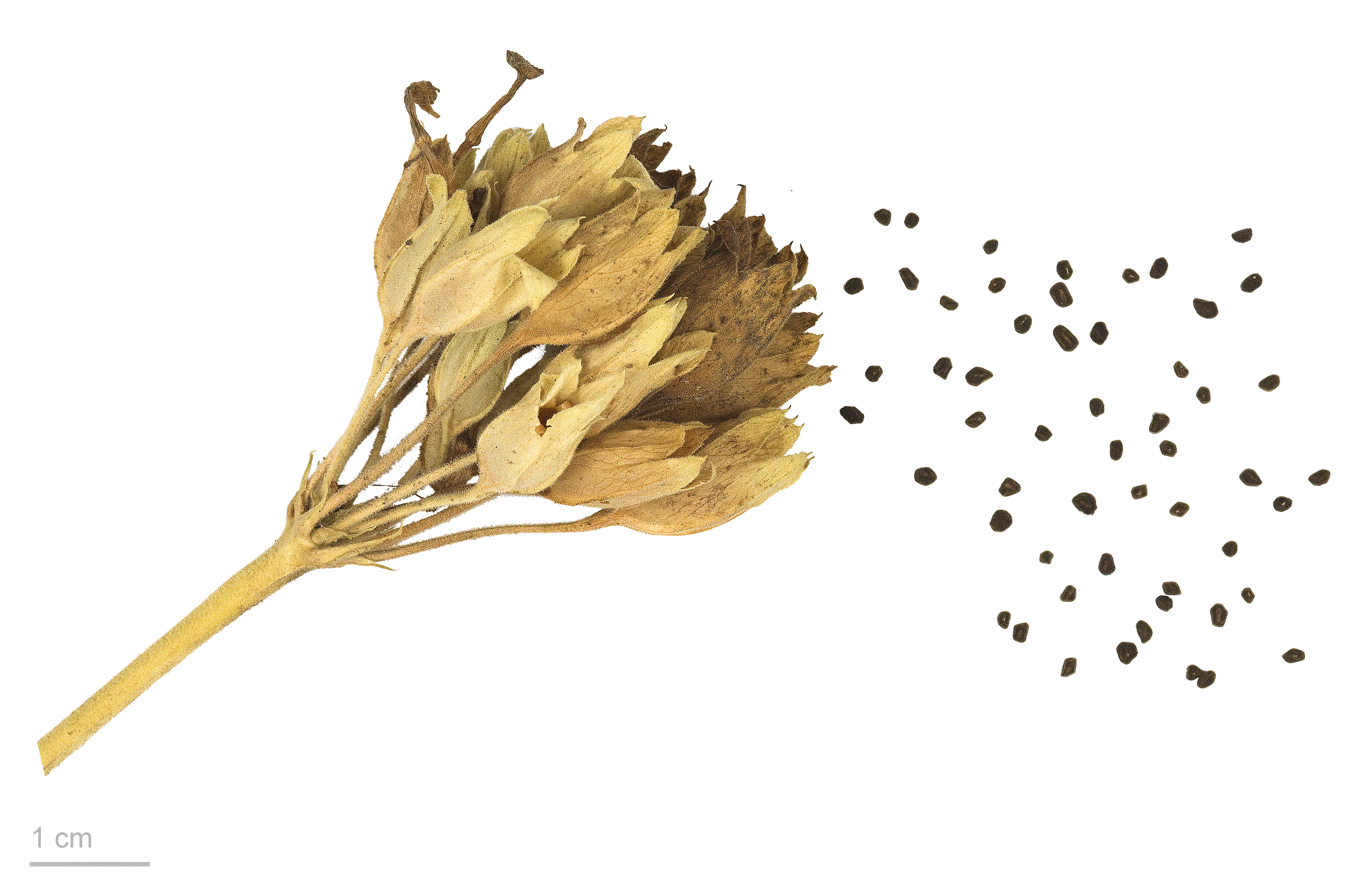
Primula veris – MHNT

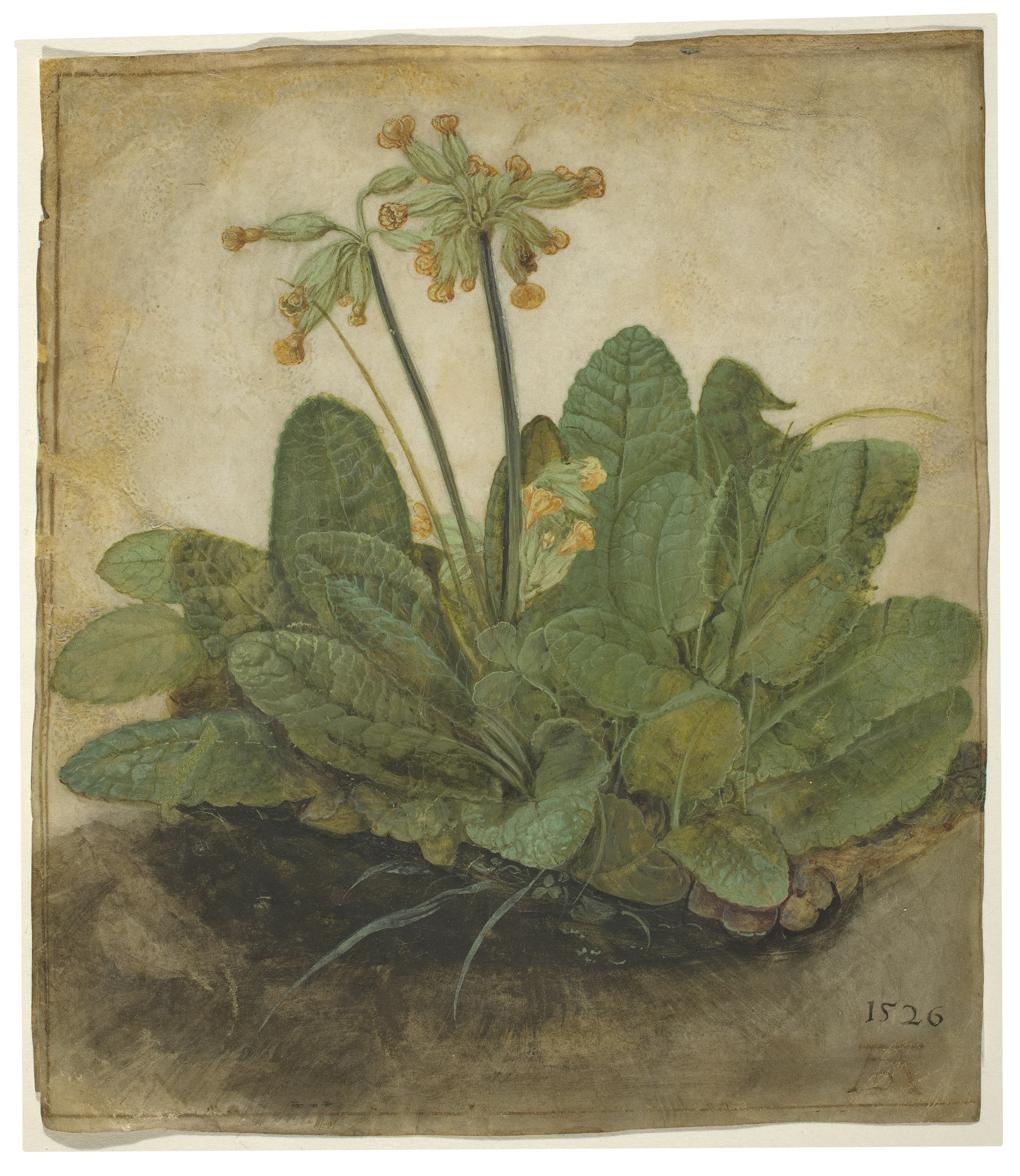
Albrecht Dürer, Tuft of Cowslips, 1526, National Gallery of Art, Washington, D.C., NGA 74162

Primula veris is a variable evergreen or semi-evergreen perennial plant growing to 25 cm (10 in) tall and broad, with a rosette of leaves 5–15 cm long and 2–6 cm broad. The deep yellow flowers are produced in spring, in clusters of 10–30 blooms together on a single stem. Each flower is 9–15 mm broad. Red- and orange-flowered plants occur rarely but can be locally widespread in areas where coloured primula hybrids bloom at the same time as the native cowslip, enabling cross-pollination.

== Distribution and habitat ==
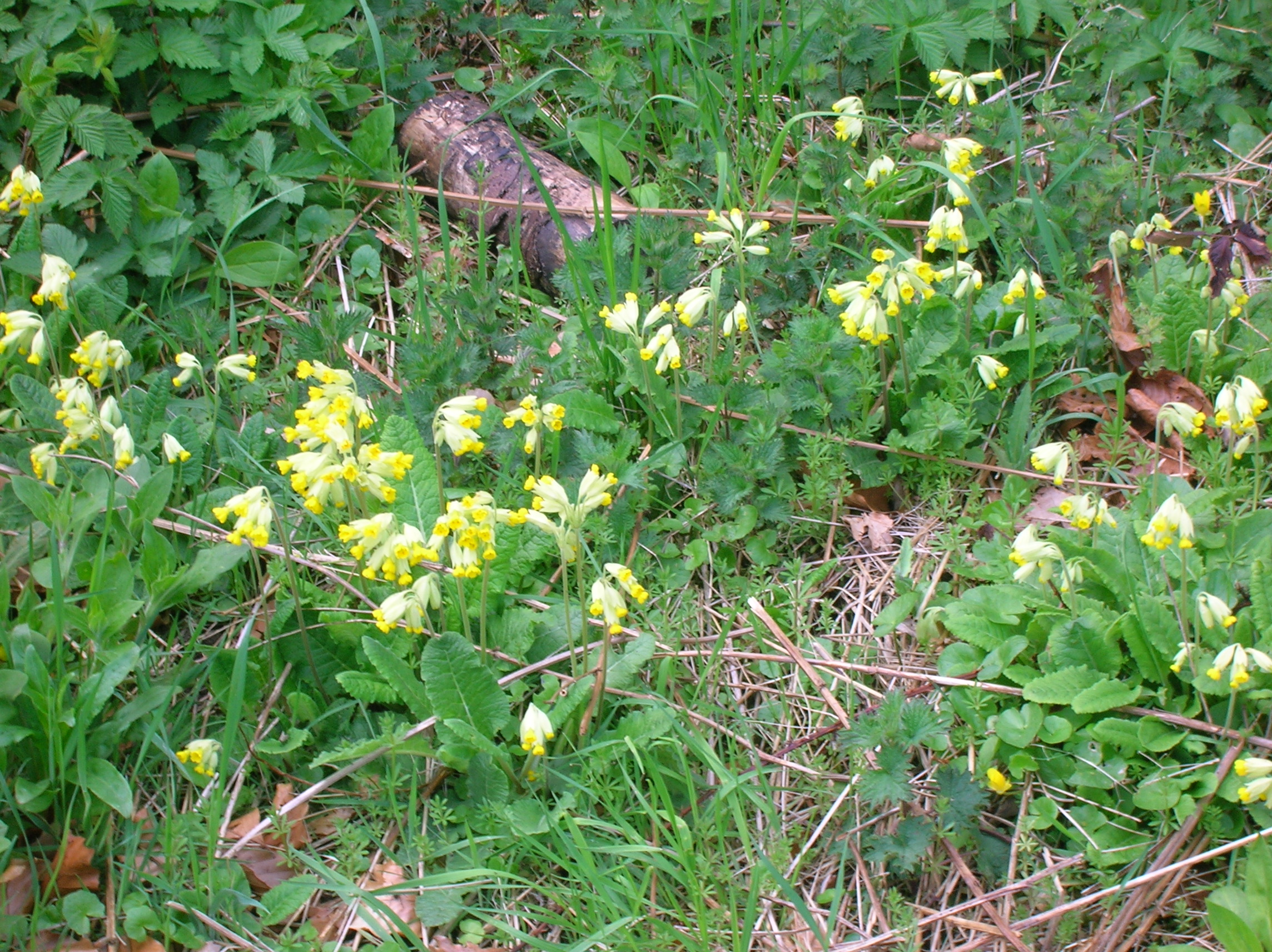
Primula veris in a meadow.

The cowslip is frequently found on more open ground than the primrose, including open fields, meadows, coastal dunes, and clifftops.

== Conservation ==
The plant suffered a decline due to changing agricultural practices throughout the 1970s and 1980s in Britain. It may therefore be rare locally, though where found it may be abundant. Additionally the seeds are now often included in wildflower seed mixes used to landscape motorway banks and similar civil engineering earthworks where the plants may be seen in dense stands. This practice has led to a revival in its fortunes.

== Cultivation ==
In cultivation this plant has gained the Royal Horticultural Society's Award of Garden Merit.

== Similar species ==
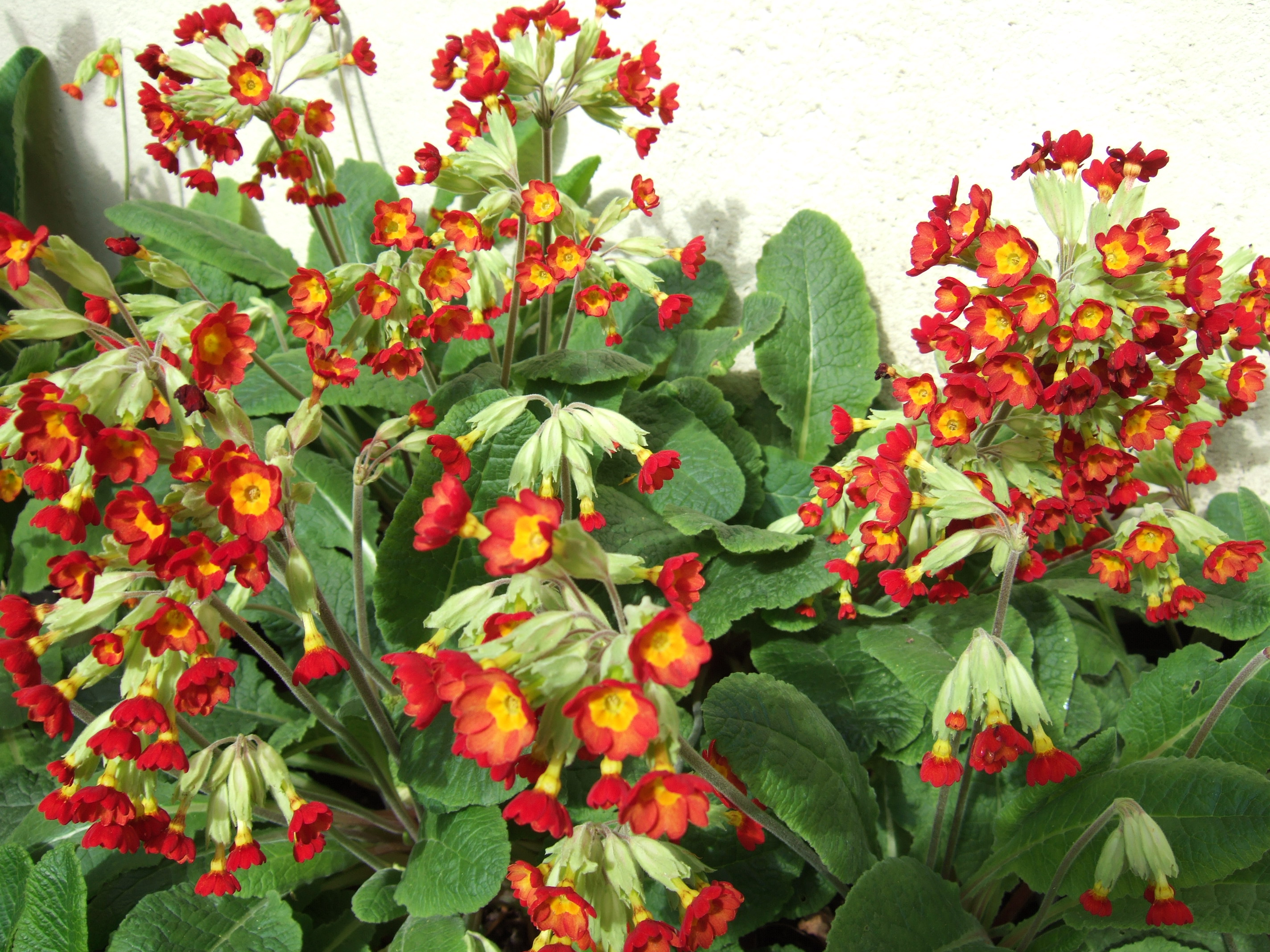
Red-flowered Primula veris plants

The cowslip may be confused with the closely related Primula elatior (oxlip) which has a similar general appearance and habitat, although the oxlip has larger, pale yellow flowers more like a primrose, and a corolla tube without folds.

== Chemical constituents ==
The roots of Primula veris contain several glycosides of 5-methoxysalicylic methyl ester, such as primeverin and primulaverin. In the crude dried root, their phenolic aglycones are responsible for the typical odour reminiscent of methyl salicylate or anethole. The dried roots contain significant amounts of triterpene saponins, such as primula acid I/II, while in the flower these constituents are located in the sepals, and the dominating constituents are flavonoids. Rare side effects of the saponins can be nausea or diarrhoea while some of the phenolic constituents are possibly responsible for allergic reactions.

The subspecies macrocalyx, growing in Siberia, contains the phenolic compound riccardin C.

== Cuisine ==
Cowslip leaves have been traditionally used in Spanish cooking as a salad green. Uses in English cookery include using the flowers to flavor country wine and vinegars; sugaring to be a sweet or eaten as part of a composed salad while the juice of the cowslip is used to prepare tansy for frying. The close cousin of the cowslip, the primrose P. vulgaris has often been confused with the cowslip and its uses in cuisine are similar with the addition of its flowers being used as a colouring agent in desserts.

English children's writer Alison Uttley in her story "The Country Child" (1931) of family life on an English farm from the perspective of a 9-year-old farmer's daughter Susan describes cowslips among the favourite flowers of her heroine and mentions her participation in preparing them for making cowslip wine, a locally important process. After its initial preparation, cowslip wine "would change to sparkling yellow wine" offered in "little fluted glasses" with a biscuit to important "morning visitors" of the farm: such as the curate coming for subscriptions, the local squire (landowner) and an occasional dealer (of their produce). This wine "was more precious than elderberry wine, which was the drink for cold weather, for snow and sleet".

In the midland and southern counties of England, a sweet and pleasant wine resembling the muscadel is made from the cowslip flower, and it is one of the most wholesome and pleasant of home-made wines, and slightly narcotic in its effects. In times when English wines were more used, every housewife in Warwickshire could produce her clear cowslip wine…the cowslip is still sold in many markets for this purpose, and little cottage girls still ramble the meadows during April and May in search of it…country people use it as a salad or boil it for the table.

Anne Pratt

== Myth and folklore ==
This herb was already mentioned by Pliny the Elder for its early blooming attributes. Species from the genus Primula along with other ritual plants played a significant role in the pharmacy and mythology of the Celtic druids, likely as an ingredient of magical potions to increase the absorption of other herbal constituents. In the Middle-Ages it was also known as St. Peter's herb or Petrella and was sought after by Florentine apothecaries. Hildegard von Bingen recommended the medicinal parts only for topical use but the leaves were also consumed as food. Other common names at the time were 'Herba paralysis', 'Verbascum', primrose, or mullein leaves. It was frequently misidentified as or confused with similar species from the genus Primula.
