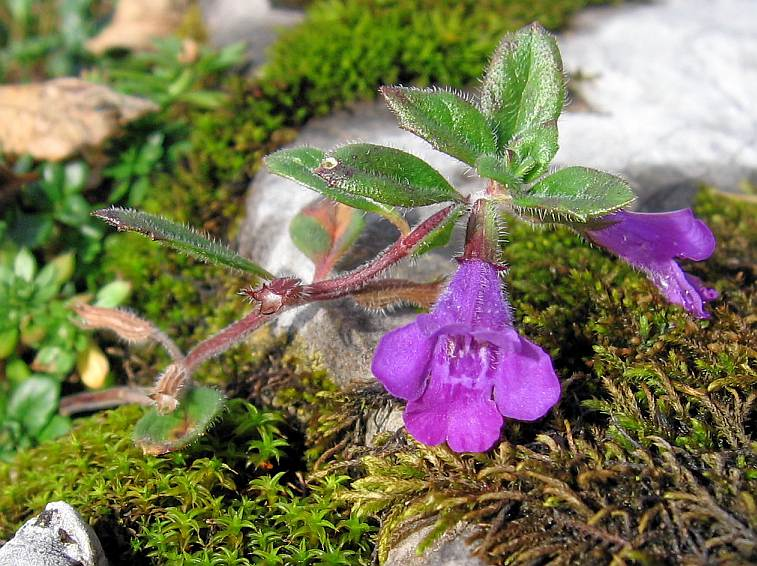

Scientific classification
- Kingdom: Plantae
- Clade: Tracheophytes
- Clade: Angiosperms
- Clade: Eudicots
- Clade: Asterids
- Order: Lamiales
- Family: Lamiaceae
- Genus: Clinopodium
- Species: C. alpinum

Binomial name
- Clinopodium alpinum (L.) Kuntze

Synonyms
- Acinos alpinus (L.) Moench; Calamintha acinos subsp. alpina (L.) Bonnier & Layens; Calamintha alpina (L.) Lam.; Faucibarba alpina (L.) Dulac; Melissa alpina (L.) Benth.; Satureja alpina (L.) Scheele; Thymus alpinus L.; Ziziphora alpicola Melnikov; Ziziphora alpina (L.) Melnikov; Ziziphora granatensis subsp. alpina (L.) Bräuchler & Gutermann

= Clinopodium alpinum =

Rock thyme

Species of flowering plant

Clinopodium alpinum, the rock thyme, is a perennial plant of the family Lamiaceae. Subspecies of rock thyme include: C. alpinum meriodionale, with smaller flowers; and C. alpinum majoranifolium, which grows in smaller bunches. Rock thyme is sometimes used in pharmacology for its diaphoretic and antipyretic properties. In addition, it can be brewed and served as tea.

== Morphology ==
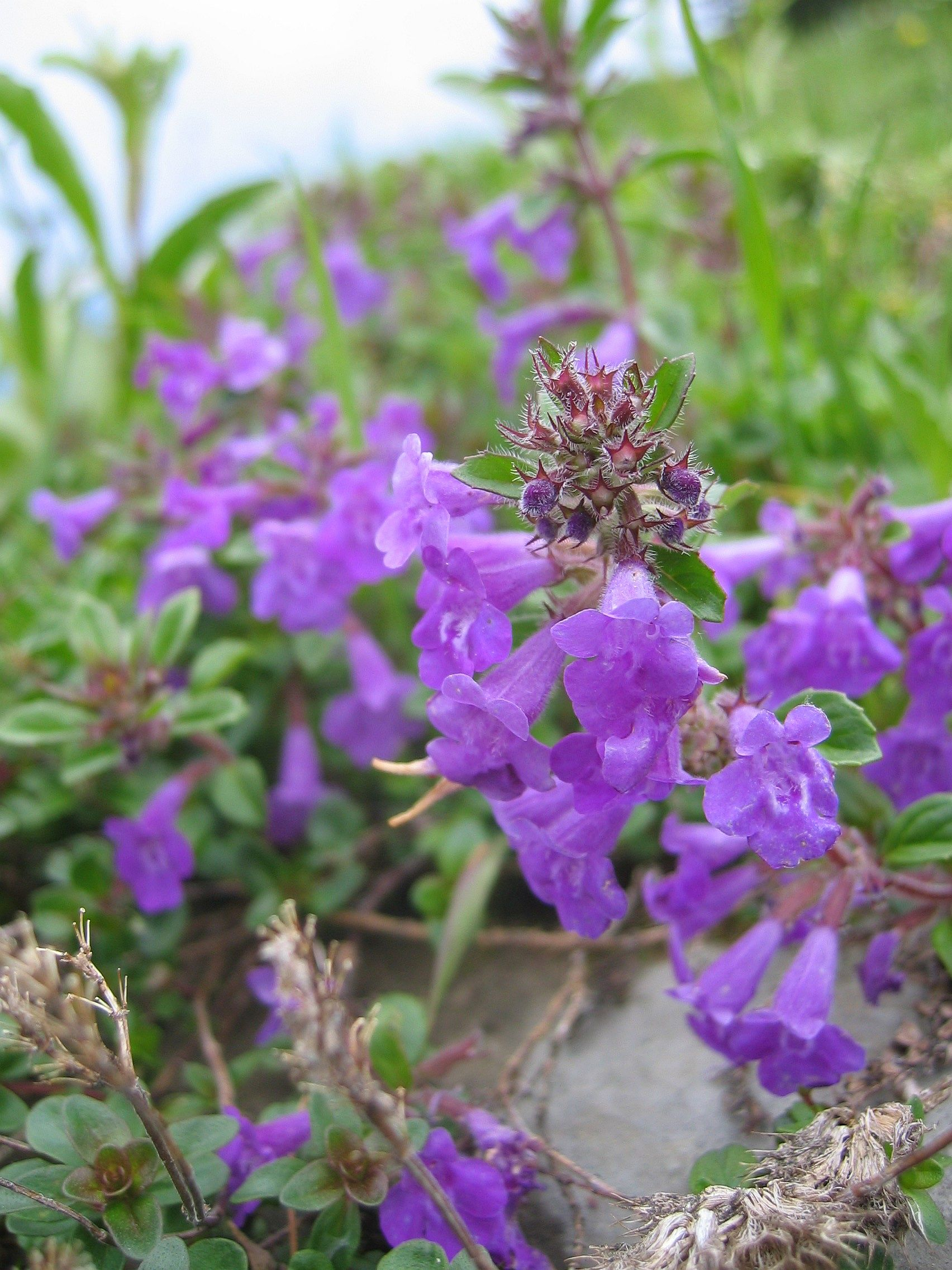
Inflorescence of Clinopodium alpinum

Rock thyme is an herbaceous plant averaging between 40 and 50 centimeters in height. The flowers are hermaphroditic; that is, they have both male and female reproductive systems. According to the Raunkiær system of categorizing life forms, rock thyme is considered to be a chamaephyte, specifically a chamaephyte sufruticosos.

The plant has a woody, fuzz-covered stem. Its leaves grow in symmetrical pairs and are connected to the stem by a thin petiole. Their shapes range from ovoid to lanceolates of 5 to 15 millimeters in length.

The flowers consist of whorled inflorescences, consisting of clusters of 3 to 8 flowers. They range from 15 to 20 mm in length, and are generally violet in color. Depending on altitude, rock thyme flowers between May and August. Its fruit is schizocarpal, and splits into four equal portions upon reaching maturity.).

It is anchored to the ground by a taproot and a network of smaller secondary roots.

== Habitat ==
The plant originates from the mountains of Southern Europe.

In Italy, rock thyme can be found in most areas whose altitude is between 900 and 2600 meters above sea level. It is found in open fields, rock fissures, and areas with little fertile soil.

== Images ==
Images of Clinopodium alpinum
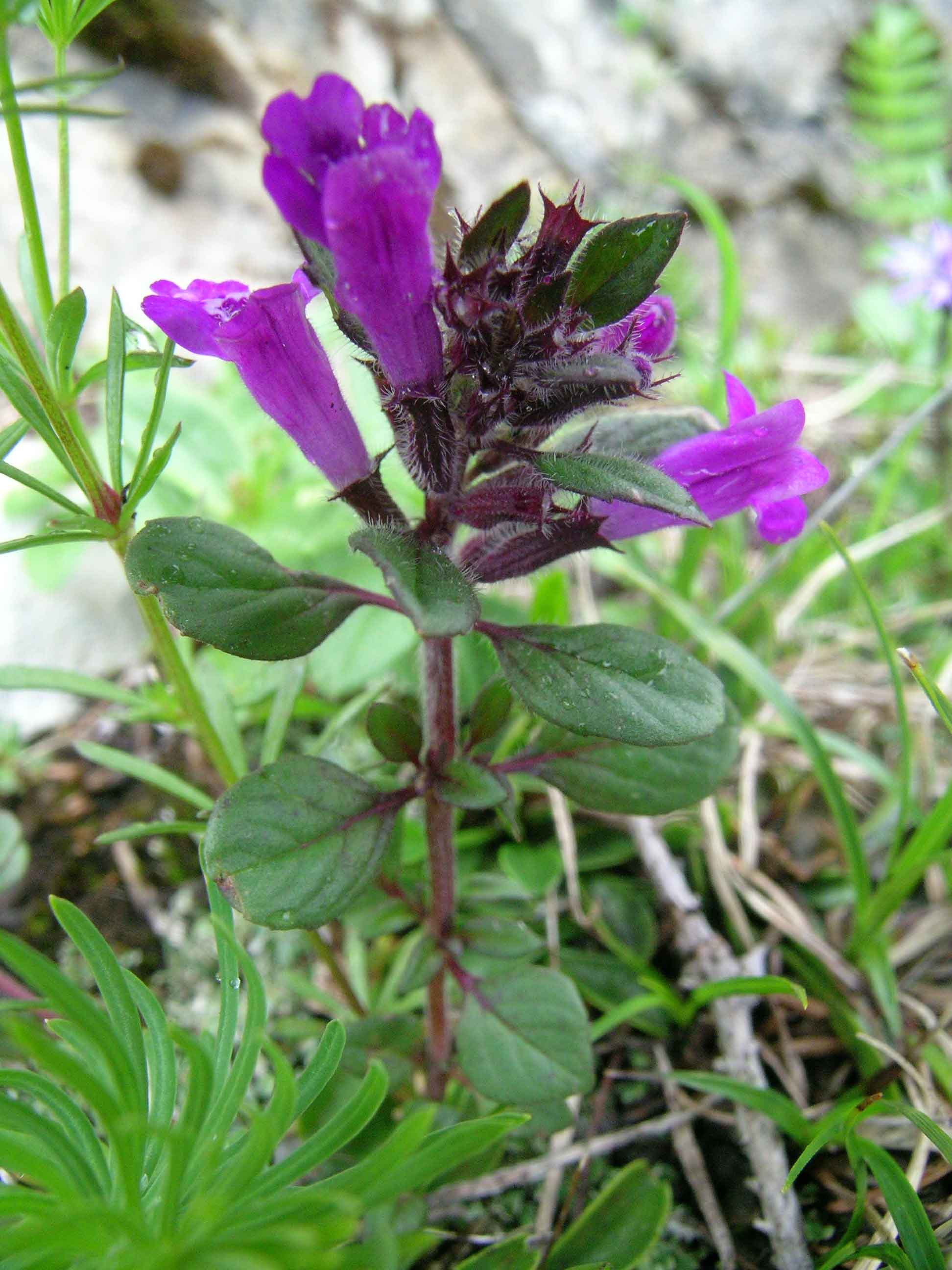

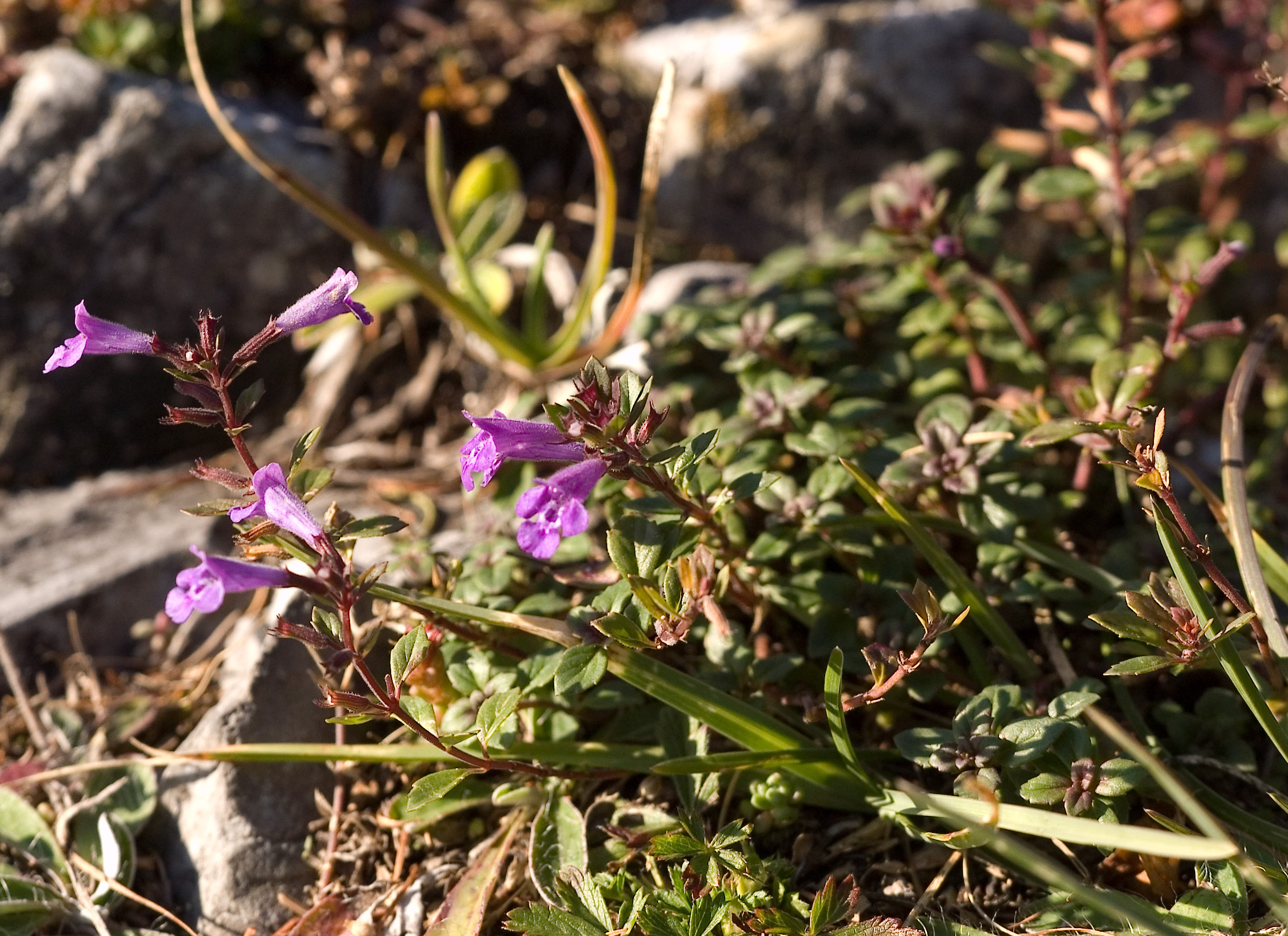

== Bibliography ==
- Pignatti, Sandro; Pignatti, S. (1982), Flora d'Italia, Bolonia: Edagricole, ISBN 88-506-2449-2
- Tutin, T.G.; Heywood, V.H. (1976), Flora Europea, Cambridge: Cambridge University Press, ISBN 0-521-08489-X
