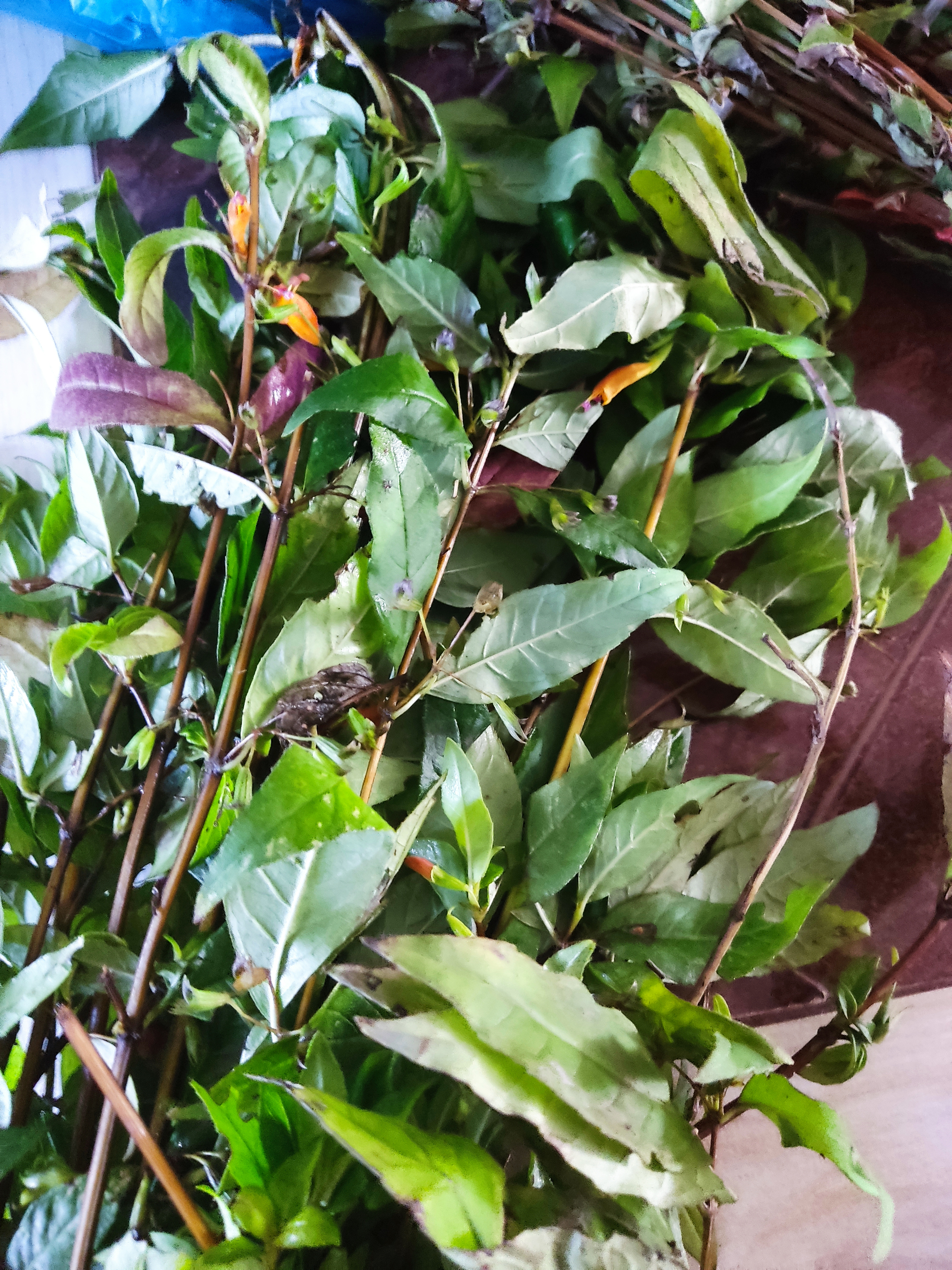

Scientific classification
- Kingdom: Plantae
- Clade: Tracheophytes
- Clade: Angiosperms
- Clade: Eudicots
- Clade: Asterids
- Order: Lamiales
- Family: Lamiaceae
- Genus: Clinopodium
- Species: C. macrostemum

Binomial name
- Clinopodium macrostemum (Moc. & Sessé et Benth) Kuntze

Synonyms
- Clinopodium laevigatum Standl.

= Clinopodium macrostemum =

Species of plant

Clinopodium macrostemum, the poleo, yerba de borracho, nurite, hediondilla, or toche, is a plant of the family Lamiaceae.

== Description ==
It is a bushy plant whose height can vary between 1 and 3 meters with erect stems and arching branches. The leaves have petioles of 2 to 5 millimeters, while their blade lengths vary from 1 to 4 centimeters long and 6 to 15 millimeters wide. It has bell-shaped flowers 2 to 3.5 centimeters long that have shades between orange and reddish.

== Distribution and habitat ==
It is usually found in temperate pine-oak or oyamel forests at altitudes between 2,400 and 3,200 meters above sea level. It is continuously distributed in the states of Jalisco, Michoacán, State of Mexico, Morelos, Guerrero, Puebla, Oaxaca and southern Hidalgo, with isolated specimens found in Sinaloa and Durango.

== Uses ==
Nurite leaf essential oil contains 32 main compounds: Linalool (55.4%), nerol (6.4%), caryophyllene (6.25%), menthone (5.8%), geranyl acetate (4.1%), terpineol (3.7%) and pulegone (2.8%). Other compounds identified in the plant are limonene, camphor, thymol, p-cymene, α-terpineol, oleanolic acid, ursolic acid and 3-hydroxy-ursenoic acid, which is why relaxing, antioxidant, antimicrobial properties are usually attributed to this plant. (because it has the capacity to inhibit up to 80% bacteria such as Escherichia coli, Staphylococcus aureus, Pseudomonas aeruginosa, and Klebsiella pneumoniae) and even larvicides against mosquito pups.

The essential oil has also shown antioxidant properties possibly attributed to the high amounts of thymol. The efficacy of methanol extracts of C. macrostem has also been shown in laboratory rats to reduce damage to liver tissue caused by the ingestion of paracetamol and damage caused by carbon tetrachloride.

In traditional medicine, nurite is used by the Purépecha people in Michoacán for the treatment of stomach upsets and properties are even attributed to it for the treatment of infertility, while in Oaxaca it is used to treat hangovers caused by excessive consumption of alcoholic beverages, it is also used as a fever reducer, for the treatment of stomach ailments and in labor for young people under 30 years of age. It is also used as a daily food, either in infusion, fresh water, as a condiment or simply eaten with a tortilla.
