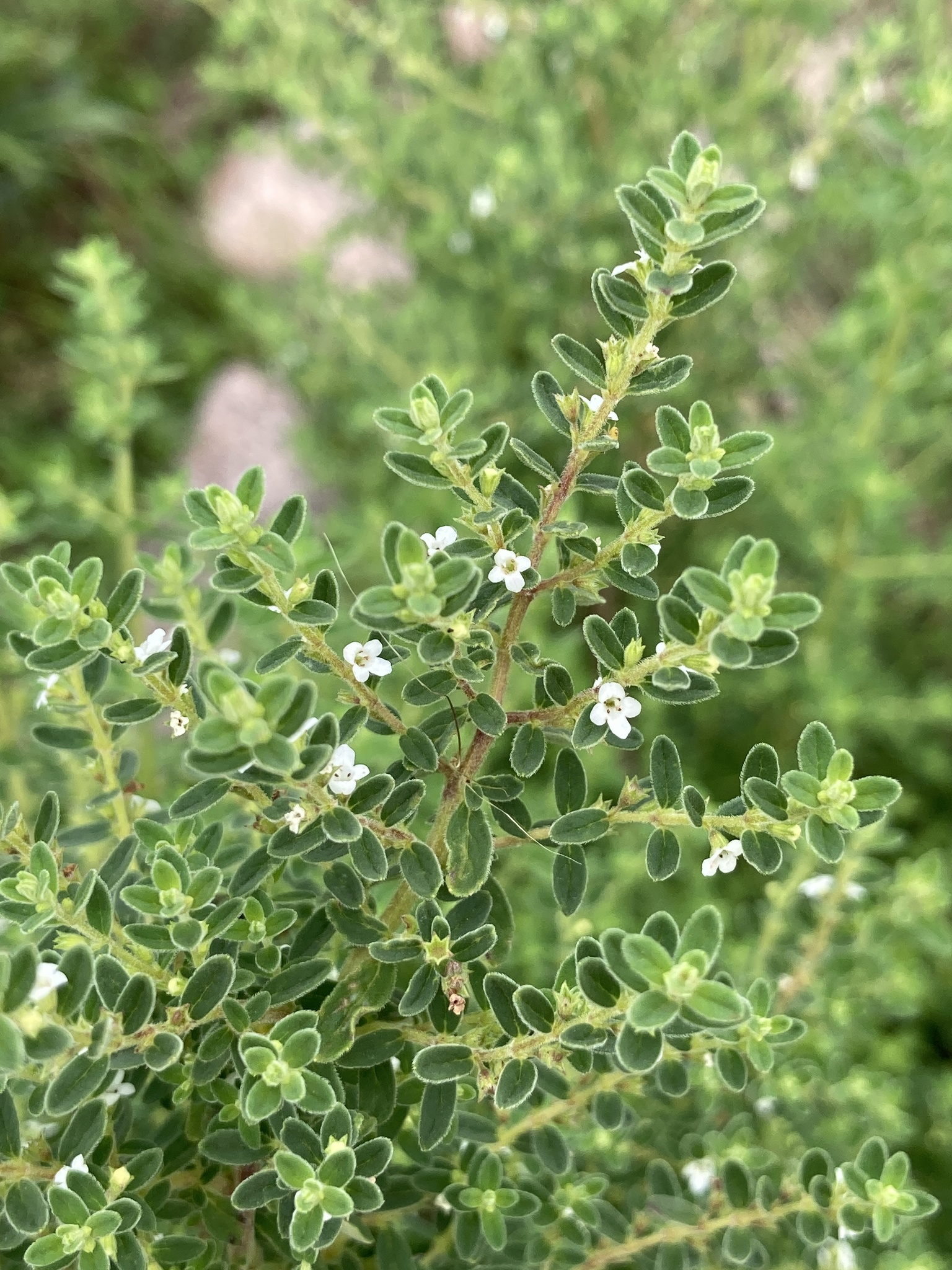

Scientific classification
- Kingdom: Plantae
- Clade: Tracheophytes
- Clade: Angiosperms
- Clade: Eudicots
- Clade: Asterids
- Order: Lamiales
- Family: Lamiaceae
- Genus: Clinopodium
- Species: C. gilliesii

Binomial name
- Clinopodium gilliesii (Benth.) Kuntze

Synonyms
- Bystropogon minutus Briq.; Micromeria eugenioides (Griseb.) Hieron.; Micromeria gilliesii Benth.; Oreosphacus parvifolia Phil.; Satureja eugenioides (Griseb.) Loes. ex R.E.Fr.; Satureja gilliesii (Benth.) Briq., nom. illeg.; Satureja oligantha Briq.; Satureja parvifolia (Phil.) Epling; Xenopoma eugenioides Griseb.

= Clinopodium gilliesii =

Species of plant

Clinopodium gilliesii is a species of flowering plant in the family Lamiaceae, native from southern Peru through Bolivia to northern Chile and northern Argentina. It was first described by George Bentham in 1891 as Micromeria gilliesii.
