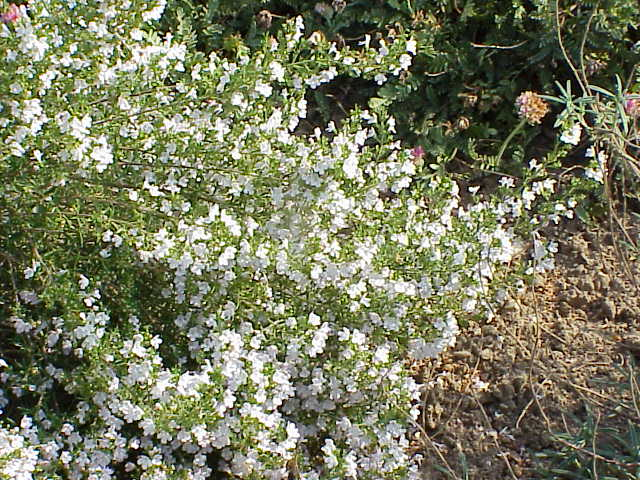

Scientific classification
- Kingdom: Plantae
- Clade: Tracheophytes
- Clade: Angiosperms
- Clade: Eudicots
- Clade: Asterids
- Order: Lamiales
- Family: Lamiaceae
- Genus: Satureja
- Species: S. montana

Binomial name
- Satureja montana L.

Synonyms
- Clinopodium montanum (L.) Kuntze; Micromeria montana (L.) Rchb.; Micromeria pygmaea Rchb.; Micromeria variegata Rchb.; Satureja brevis Jord. & Fourr.; Satureja ciliata Avé-Lall.; Satureja flexuosa Jord. & Fourr.; Satureja hyssopifolia Bertol.; Satureja karstiana Justin; Satureja montana var. chamaebuxus Briq.; Satureja montana var. communis Vis.; Satureja montana subsp. montana Satureja montana var. stenophylla; Boiss. Satureja montana f. subquadrangula; (Rohlena) Šilic Satureja montana var. subquadrangula; Rohlena Satureja mucronifolia; Stokes Satureja ovalifolia; Huter, Porta & Rigo Satureja petraea; Jord. & Fourr. Satureja pollinonis; Huter, Porta & Rigo Satureja provincialis; Jord. & Fourr. Satureja pyrenaica; Jord. & Fourr. Satureja rigidula; Jord. & Fourr. Satureja trifida; Moench Saturiastrum montanum; (L.) Fourr. Saturiastrum petraeum; Fourr. Thymus montanus; (L.) Dum.Cours. [Illegitimate]

= Winter savory =

Species of flowering plant

Satureja montana (winter savory or mountain savory), is a perennial, semi-evergreen herb in the family Lamiaceae, native to warm temperate regions of southern Europe, the Mediterranean, and Africa. It has dark green leaves and summer flowers ranging from pale lavender, pink to white. The closely related summer savory (Satureja hortensis L.) is an annual plant.

== Description ==
It grows to between 10 and 40 cm (4 and 16 in) tall. The leathery, dark green leaves are opposite, oval-lanceolate or needle-like, 1–2 cm long and 5 mm broad. The flowers appear in summer, between July and October, and range from pale lavender or pink to white. The flowers are smaller than summer savoury flowers. It contains carvacrol, a monoterpenoid phenol.

The herb was first published by Carl Linnaeus in his book Species Plantarum on page 568 in 1753. The Latin specific epithet montana refers to mountains or coming from mountains, leading to the common name 'mountain savory'.

== Distribution and habitat ==
Satureja montana is native to temperate areas between Europe, the Mediterranean, and Africa. It has been naturalised in Great Britain. It can be found growing in old walls, on dry banks and rocks on hillsides, or rocky mountain slopes, usually on calcareous or alkaline soils.

== Cultivation and uses ==
There is evidence of its use about 2000 years ago by the ancient Romans and Greeks.

Winter savory is easy to grow and can be used as a culinary herb garden edging plant. It requires six hours of sun per day and well-draining soil. In temperate climates it becomes dormant in winter, putting out leaves on the bare stems in the spring. While dormant, it should not be cut back; stems which appear dead will leaf-out again. Winter savory is hardy and has a low-bunching habit.

It is hardy to USDA Zone 4 and can be propagated from softwood cuttings. Winter savory is used as a companion plant for beans, keeping bean weevils away, and is also planted with roses to reduce mildew and aphids.

S. montana 'Nana' is a known dwarf cultivar. S. montana 'Prostrate White' is a small white flowered form.

S. montana is also a honey plant, with savory honey being a regional product from Abruzzo in Italy.

== Culinary uses ==
In cooking, winter savory has a reputation for going very well with both beans and meats, very often lighter meats such as chicken or turkey, and can be used in stuffing. It can also be used in soups and sauces. It has a strong flavour (stronger than summer savory) while uncooked but loses much of its flavour with prolonged cooking. It can be added to breadcrumbs as a coating for various meats including trout.

== Traditional uses ==
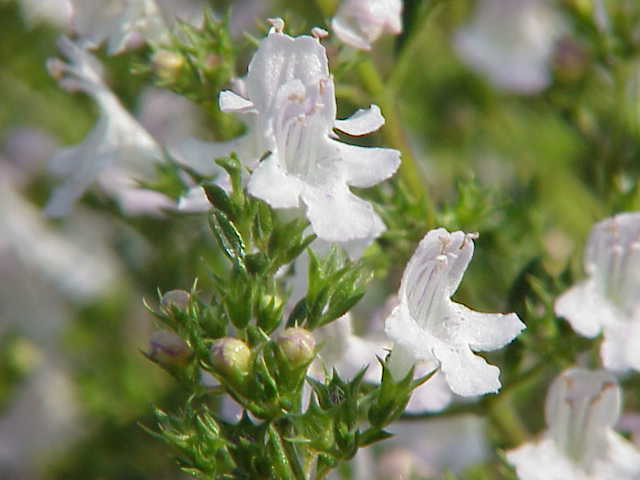
Flowers

Winter savory may have been used in ancient traditional medicine, possibly in the treatment of bee stings. The plant is harvested when flowering in the summer for use fresh or dried.

== Strewing herb ==
The Saturejas have been traditionally used to strew on the floor since the medieval times, as an aromatic herb that reduce insects.
