= Apple mint =

Apple mint is a common name for Mentha suaveolens, and hybrid mints involving M. suaveolens as a parent

Apple mints of hybrid origin include:

- Mentha × rotundifolia (M. longifolia × M. suaveolens)
- Mentha × villosa (M. spicata × M. suaveolens) - also called Mentha nemorosa, popular in Cuba where it is called yerba buena and is used to make mojitos
