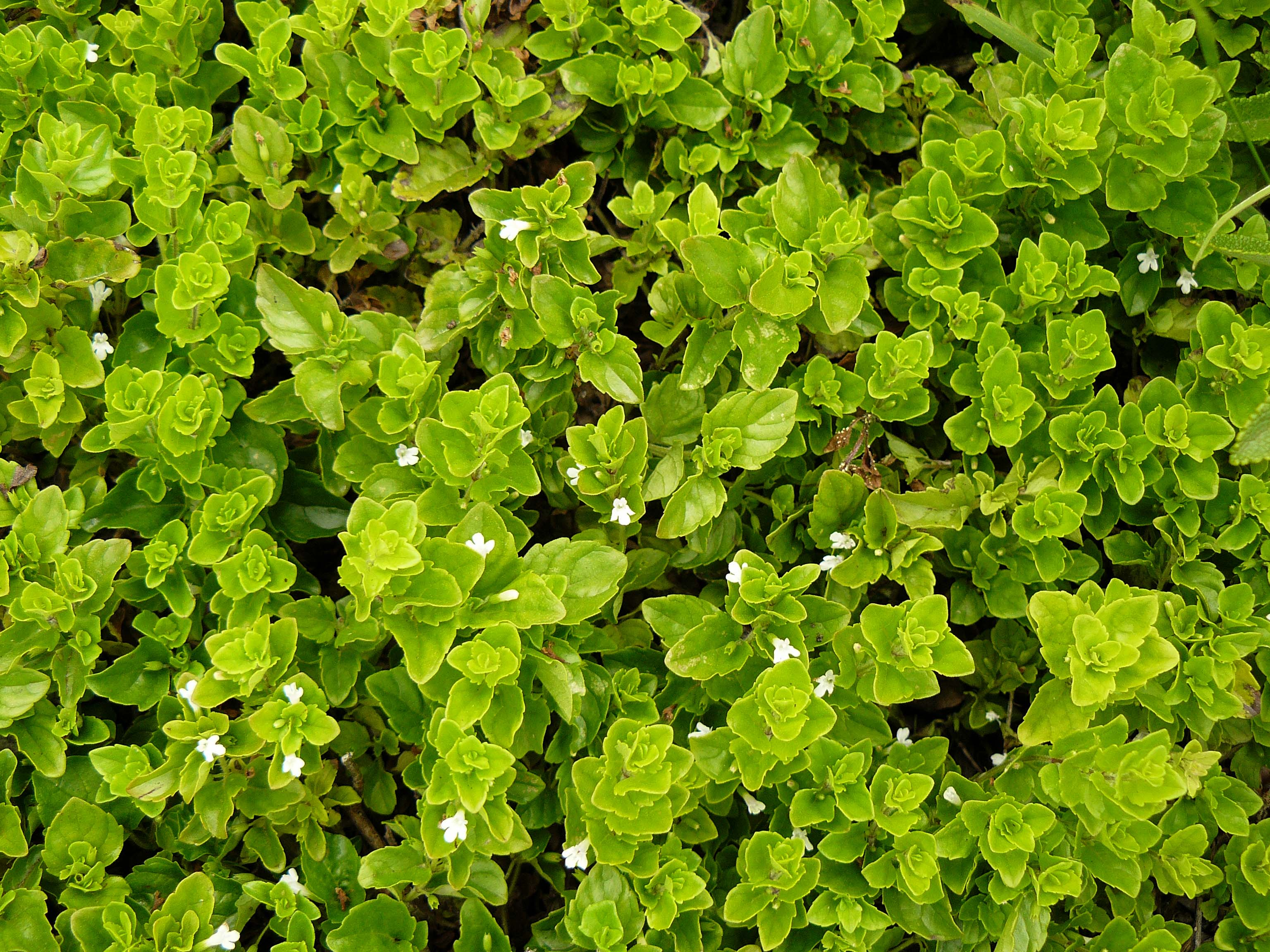

Conservation status
- Secure (NatureServe)

Scientific classification
- Kingdom: Plantae
- Clade: Tracheophytes
- Clade: Angiosperms
- Clade: Eudicots
- Clade: Asterids
- Order: Lamiales
- Family: Lamiaceae
- Genus: Clinopodium
- Species: C. douglasii

Binomial name
- Clinopodium douglasii (Benth.) Kuntze (1891)

Synonyms
- Thymus douglasii Benth. (basionym); Thymus chamissonis Benth.; Micromeria douglasii Benth.; Micromeria barbata Fisch. & C.A.Mey.; Micromeria chamissonis (Benth.) Greene; Satureja douglasii (Benth.) Briq.; "Satureja chamissonis" (Benth.) Epling & Játiva (nom. inval.); "Hesperothymus douglasii" (Benth) A. Doroszenko (nom. inval.)

= Clinopodium douglasii =

Species of plant

Clinopodium douglasii, (synonym Micromeria douglasii), yerba buena, or Oregon tea is a rambling aromatic herb of western and northwestern North America, ranging from British Columbia southwards to Southern California and from the Pacific coast eastwards to western Montana. The plant takes the form of a sprawling, mat-forming perennial. The name "yerba buena" derives from Spanish for "good herb" and is applied to various other plants.

== Description ==
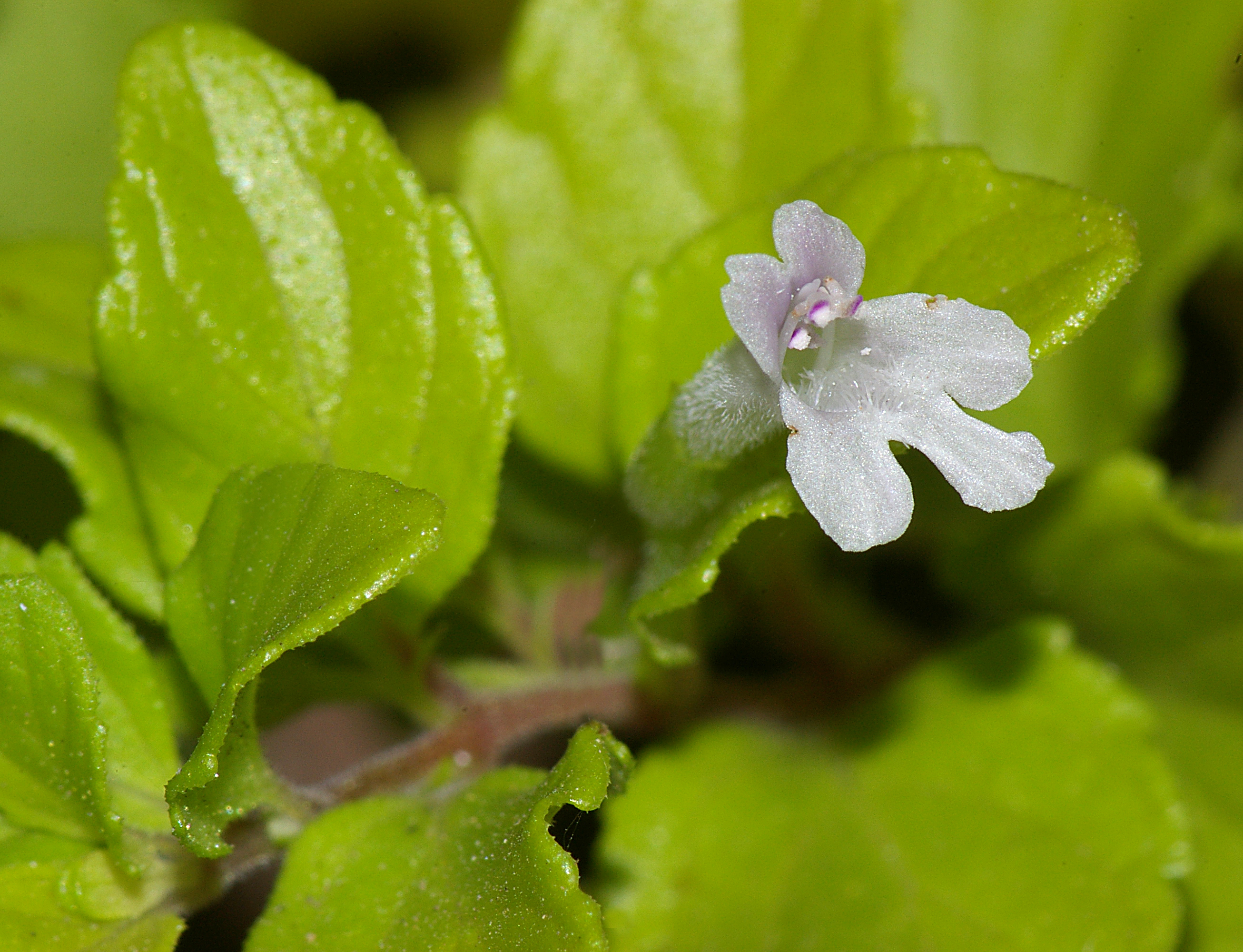
Leaves and flowers of Clinopodium douglasii.

Clinopodium douglasii is a decumbent perennial herb. Leaves are in an opposite arrangement along the stem, and each leaf is subtended by a petiole, is relatively small in size, and ovate to almost triangular in shape, with the leaf margin being shallowly toothed. Flowers occur at the leaf axils, and are solitary (occasionally a cluster of 2-3 flowers) on a short pedicel. The flower consists of a tubular calyx that subtends a lobed, bilaterally symmetrical, labiate corolla typical of the mint family, white to lavender in color, and typically 3-8 millimeters in length. The inner flower, found under the upper "lip" of the corolla, consists of 2 fused styles with a 2-lobed stigma and 4 exserted stamens arranged in 2 pairs. The fruit is a tiny nutlet with a smooth surface. The leaves and other parts of the plant are strongly aromatic and have a minty odor.

== Distribution ==
Clinopodium douglasii is native to the western United States and Canada, ranging from western British Columbia to southern California and parts of the interior mountain ranges of the Pacific Northwest and northern California. The coastal and interior mountain distributions of this species are largely disjunct, and it is largely absent from the dry interior regions between these areas, such as the Interior and Columbia Plateaus and California's Central Valley.

The northern limit of the natural distribution of this species is in British Columbia, in the eastern and southern part of Vancouver Island and the Gulf Islands, as well as nearby mainland areas along the Salish Sea. In western Washington and Oregon, C. douglasii ranges from the western side of the Cascade Range westward through the San Juan Islands, the Puget Lowland, and the Williamette Valley to the Olympic Mountains and Pacific Coast Ranges, though it is relatively less frequent near to the Pacific coast. Southward from southwestern Oregon and into California, the distribution gradually becomes more coastal, ranging from the Pacific coast into the Klamath Mountains and California Coast Ranges. It is commonly found as far south as the Santa Monica Mountains and Santa Catalina Island. There is also a single collection of C. douglasii reported from Juneau, Alaska, but this is thought to be the result of an introduction, and this species is not otherwise found that far north.

C. douglasii is also found in the moist western ranges of the interior mountains of the Pacific Northwest, such as the Columbia Mountains, the westernmost subranges of the Rocky Mountains, and the Blue and Wallowa Mountains, ranging from the British Columbia Interior south to northeastern Oregon and as far east as northern Idaho and western Montana. In California, it occurs occasionally in the western side of the northern Sierra Nevada.

== History ==
Clinopodium douglasii was widely used by the indigenous peoples of California and the Pacific Northwest Coast, generally in the form of a tea, both as a medicine and as a beverage. Ethnobotanical records of use of the plant are recorded among many indigenous peoples ranging from the Saanich of British Columbia to the Luiseño and Cahuilla of southern California. Later Spanish- and English-speaking settlers learned of the uses of this plant from native peoples and incorporated it into their own folk medicine traditions. Spanish missionaries gave the name yerba buena or hierba buena (good herb) to the plant, a Spanish common name for spearmint and other edible mints.

The herb has had a long association with the history of San Francisco. In 1776, Pedro Font, the Franciscan chaplain of the de Anza Expedition, noted the abundance of hierba buena around the expedition's encampment at Mountain Lake, near to the Presidio of San Francisco, for which the expedition was tasked with finding a site. In the Spanish and Mexican eras of San Francisco, the undeveloped northwestern corner of San Francisco, where the plant was abundant, was given the name El Paraje de Yerba Buena (Place of the Yerba Buena). The area included Yerba Buena Cove, a favored anchorage, and the name was later extended to the Isla de la Yerba Buena (Yerba Buena Island), which faced the cove. In 1835, the civilian pueblo of Yerba Buena was founded on the shores of the cove, which would later grow into the American city of San Francisco. "Yerba Buena" is still used for many place names in the San Francisco area.

== Taxonomy ==
=== Early collections and type specimen ===
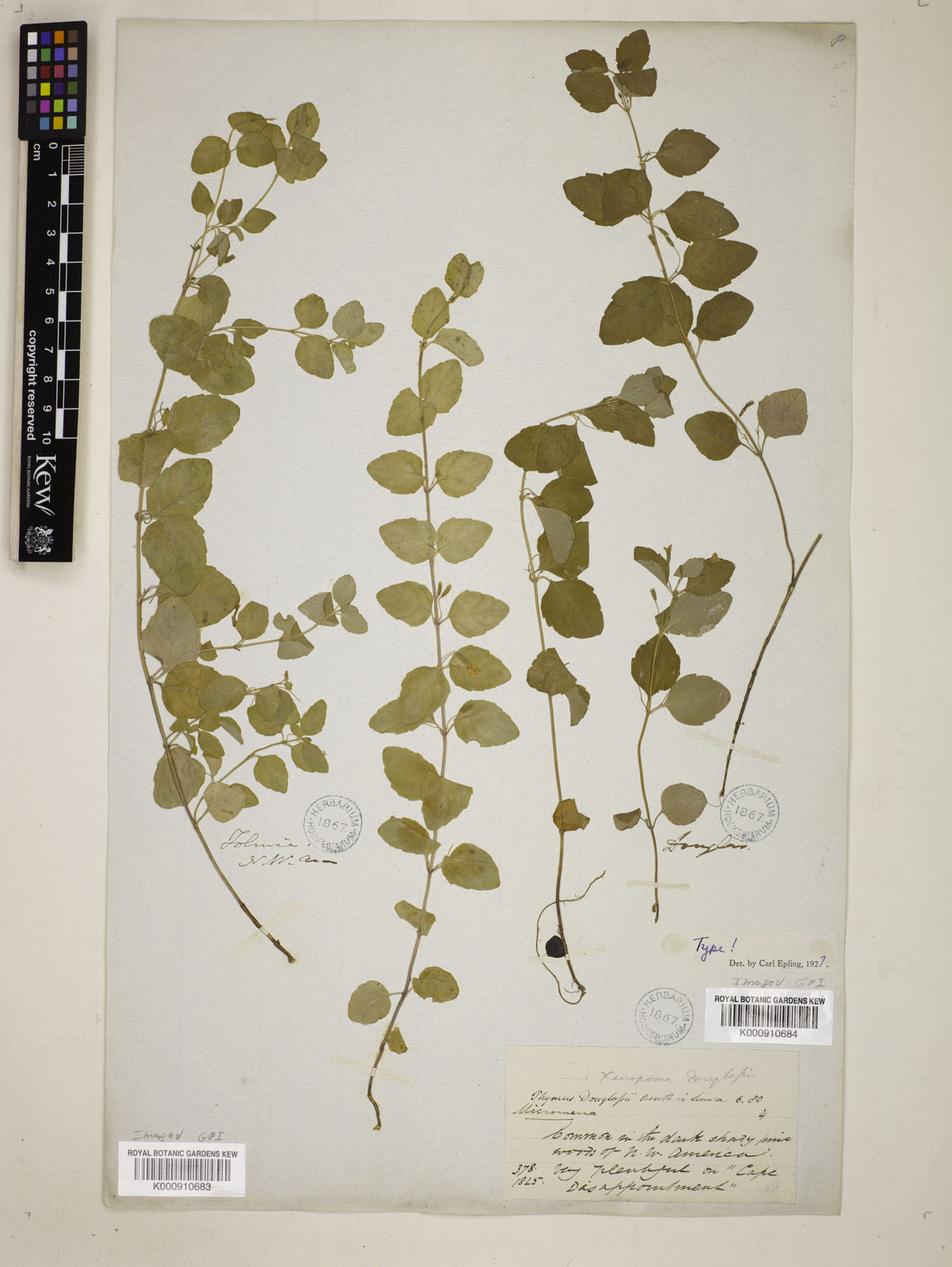
Type specimen of Micromeria douglasii (K000910684, right), collected by David Douglas in 1825, on shared herbarium sheet with non-type specimen (left) of the same species. Kew Herbarium.

In 1816, the Rurik expedition visited San Francisco and its chief botanist, Adelbert von Chamisso, made the first scientific collections of this species. These botanical specimens were eventually sent to George Bentham, a botanist specializing in the mint family, for botanical diagnosis. Bentham examined these specimens for his initial publication of this species and in latter work on this species, also examined collections made by Archibald Menzies, David Douglas, and John Scouler, among others. By the 20th century, the initial collections made by von Chamisso were lost, and in 1927 Carl Epling selected an early collection made by David Douglas in 1825 at Cape Disappointment, near the mouth of the Columbia River, as the neotype specimen. This type specimen is currently deposited in Kew Herbarium.

=== 19th and 20th centuries ===
George Bentham examined von Chamisso's 1816 collections from San Francisco and made the first publication of the species name in 1831, initially recognizing the samples as belonging to two related but different species, Thymus Chamissonis (named for von Chamisso) and Thymus Douglasii (named in honor of David Douglas). (Note: Species epithets within binomial names are always lowercased according to the modern rules of the International Code of Nomenclature for algae, fungi, and plants, even when the species epithet is derived from a normally capitalized proper noun like the name of a person or geographic location. However, the practices of biological nomenclature that were in effect in 19th Century routinely capitalized species epithets named for persons. The usage and spellings here reflects Bentham's original designations for historical purposes rather than representing a valid name under current nomenclatural rules.) In 1834, Bentham transferred the species from Thymus to Micromeria and merged the two species under the name Micromeria Douglassii. Bentham had initially separated the two based on small differences in leaf shape and position, but after examining more specimens, decided that what he had called Thymus Chamissonis was simply an ecotypic variation caused by growing in a more open environment than the specimen of Thymus Douglasii that he'd first examined. In 1842, Friedrich Ernst Ludwig von Fischer and Carl Anton von Meyer described a collection of yerba buena made at Fort Ross as a separate species, Micromeria barbata, based on the hairy inner surface of the corolla tube. This differentiation has not been generally accepted by later authors, who regard it as a synonym of Micromeria or Clinopodium douglasii.

When Bentham transferred this species to Micromeria, he placed it in a newly described section, Micromeria sect. Hesperothymus, alongside other species such as Micromeria Brownei, based largely on the arrangement of flowers (mostly solitary pedicellate flowers found at the leaf axils), as well as the presence of more or less dentate leaf margins and the often prostrate, spreading habit of the plant overall. The subgeneric classification of this species in sect. Hesperothymus was adhered to by botanical authors through the 19th and 20th centuries, however, the generic classification of sect. Hesperothymus varied considerably between authors, leading to this species being placed in a number of genera over its history. In the 1890s, Otto Kuntze and John Isaac Briquet argued that many of Bentham's mint family genera were poorly defined and pursued a lumping classification strategy, with Kuntze placing all sections of Micromeria within Clinopodium and Briquet placing them in Satureja. While Kuntze argued that the name Clinopodium had priority due to its use by pre-Linnean authors, Briquet's classification system proved more popular with later taxonomists.

For the next century following Briquet's publication, the names Micromeria douglasii, Micromeria chamissonis, and Satureja douglasii were all in use by various botanical authors. Usage depended on whether the author accepted Bentham's concept of the genus Micromeria or Briquet's broader concept of Satureja, and also on some disagreement as to whether the species epithet chamissonis or douglasii took priority, as both names had been found in the original publication of this species. New discoveries of Lamiaceae species through the 20th century that did not fit well into Bentham's generic concepts led to more plant taxonomists (particularly in North America) embracing the broader genus concept of Satureja by the latter half of the 20th century, and use of the name Satureja douglasii for this species overwhelmingly predominated in field guides and regional floras as a result.

=== Molecular phylogenetic work and current status ===
Beginning in the 1990s, the growth of molecular phylogenetics led to the findings that existing concepts of Satureja and Micromeria were polyphyletic and led to more circumscribed monophyletic definitions of these genera. In 1995, Philip D. Cantino and Steven J. Wagstaff, carried out the first molecular phylogenetic tree that included this species, based on a restriction site analysis. They concluded that Calamintha and a number of New World Mentheae genera and species, including then-Satureja douglasii, formed a distinct clade separate from Satureja sensu stricto (represented by Satureja montana) and from Micromeria. In 1998, they recommended use of Clinopodium as a synonym for Calamintha and that the former was the older name that took priority, and that species of sect. Hesperothymus also be transferred to a new, broadly defined genus Clinopodium, specifically listing Clinopodium douglasii (Benth.) Kuntze as the preferred name for this species. This concept of Clinopodium was endorsed in later synoptical works on the family Lamiaceae and the genus Micromeria published in the 2000s.

In 2010, Christian Bräuchler and coauthors published a large scale molecular phylogenetic analysis of the subtribe Menthinae based on DNA sequencing of both nuclear ITS and several regions of chloroplast DNA. The resulting phylogeny showed strong support for three distinct clades within the Menthinae: Satureja, Micromeria, and a "Clinopodium group" that included a "New World" subgroup that in turn included Clinopodium douglasii along with a number of other New World species, variously under the name Clinopodium and the names of 22 other genera. The relationship of C. douglasii to other members of the New World group was not well-resolved in this analysis. The polyphyletic nature of Clinopodium was acknowledged, but no further name changes were recommended until systematic nomenclatural work was carried out on this complex group. In the 2010s, further molecular phylogenetic work on the subtribe Menthinae by Bryan T. Drew and Kenneth J. Sytsma using various chloroplast and nuclear DNA sequences more clearly resolved the cladistic structure of this group and the relationships of Clinopodium douglasii.

The phylogeny depicted below is based on those outlined in Bräuchler (2010), Drew & Sytsma (2012), and Drew, et al. (2017), and follows the cladistic terminology given in Bräuchler (2010):

- Menthinae
  - - Satureja group (including Thymus)
    - Micromeria group
  - - Mentha/Cyclotrichium group
    - - - Clinopodium sensu strictu
        - - Bystropogon
          - "Acinos"/Ziziphora group
      - - Clinopodium dalmaticum/"Mentha" arvensis group
        - "New World group"

The New World group includes Clinopodium douglasii and a large number of other species of Clinopodium sensu lato, as well as 22 named genera. Within the New World group, the phylogenetic trees in the papers by Drew, et al. suggest a relationship between C. douglasii and several South American species currently classified as Clinopodium, such as C. sericifolium and C. taxifolium, as well as the South American genus Minthostachys.

As of October 2025, the majority of current plant name databases, including Plants of the World Online, the Jepson Herbarium eFlora, iNaturalist, Calflora, and the USDA PLANTS Database, all place the species in Clinopodium rather than Micromeria.

== Uses ==
This species was used by native groups throughout its range of occurrence, from Southern California to western British Columbia, both as a beverage and a medicine. The most widespread use was as a mint-flavored tea consumed as a beverage, a use that was taken up by non-native settlers as well. The herb was also used as a medicine, particularly as a treatment for colds and fevers, for abdominal pain and colic, and as a "blood purifier" or as "good for the kidneys". Prepared in the form of a strong decoction or infused in goat's milk, yerba buena was used as an anthelmintic by the Rumsen and Mutsen Ohlone and the Chumash, as well as by Mission Indians and Californios in the Central Coast area of California. The Hoopa and Karuk peoples are reported to have sometimes worn vines of the plant around their neck or in their hair as a fragrance, while native people of the Oregon coast are said to have used the aromatic plant to disguise their scent when hunting.

== See also ==
- Clinopodium chandleri
- Clinopodium mimuloides
