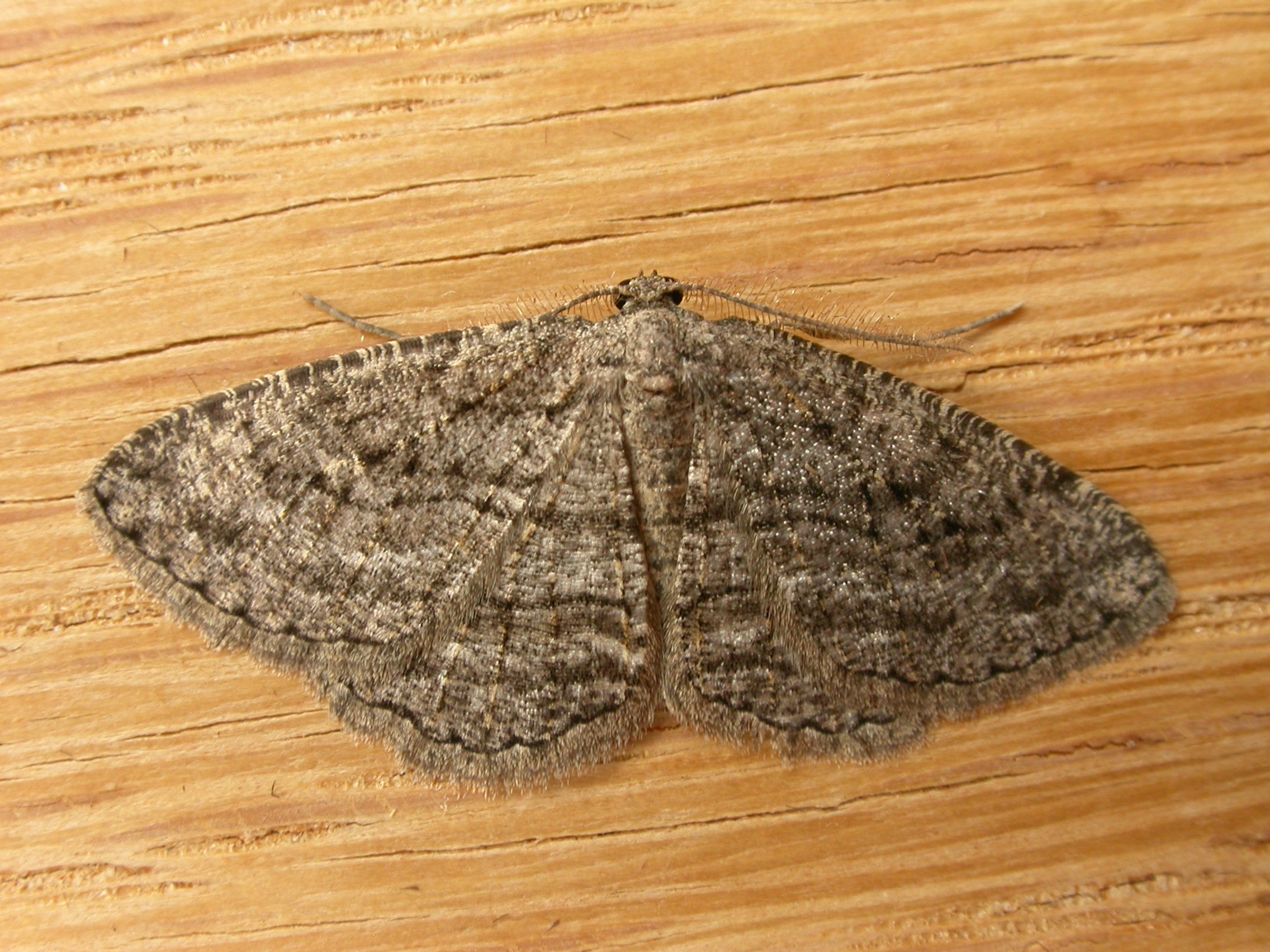

Scientific classification
- Kingdom: Animalia
- Phylum: Arthropoda
- Class: Insecta
- Order: Lepidoptera
- Family: Geometridae
- Subfamily: Ennominae
- Genus: Zermizinga; Walker, [1863]

= Zermizinga =

Genus of moths

Zermizinga is a moth genus in the family Geometridae erected by Francis Walker in 1863. Species within this genus include Zermizinga sinuata, the lucerne looper or spider moth, which was described by Warren in 1897, as well as Zermizinga indocilisaria, which was described by Walker in 1863.

Z. sinuata is found in the Australian states of New South Wales, Victoria and Tasmania. The larvae of Z. sinuata feed on Fabaceae species, such as Lotus cruentus and Medicago sativa. They have also been found on Mentha spicata and Pinus radiata.

Z. indocilisaria is found in New Zealand and is said to be found in Tasmania, Australia.
