= Yerba buena =

Set of aromatic plants

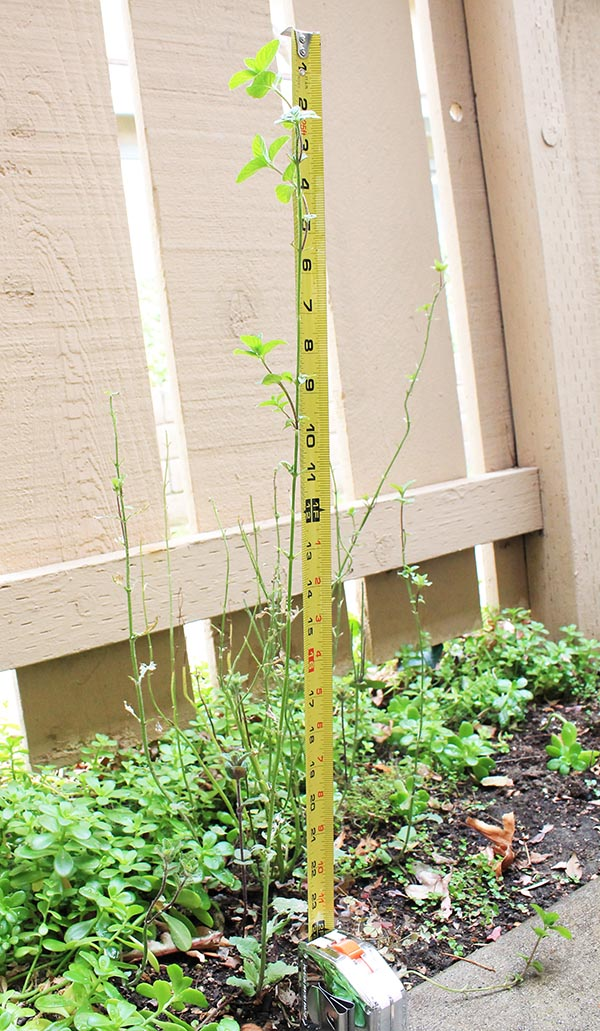
2' tall yerba buena in garden

Yerba buena or hierba buena (lit. 'good herb' in Spanish) are various aromatic plants, most of which belong to the mint family. The specific plant species varies from region to region, depending on what grows wild in the surrounding landscape, or which species is customarily grown in local gardens. Perhaps the most common variation of this plant is spearmint (Mentha spicata). It covers a number of aromatic true mints and mint relatives of the genera Clinopodium, Satureja or Micromeria. All plants so named are associated with medicinal properties, and some have culinary value as herbal teas or seasonings as well.

== Local variants ==
In the western United States, yerba buena most often refers to the species Clinopodium douglasii (synonyms: Satureja douglasii, Micromeria douglasii), but may rarely refer to Eriodictyon californicum, which is more commonly known as yerba santa.

In parts of Central America yerba buena often refers to Eau de Cologne mint, a true mint sometimes called "bergamot mint" with a strong citrus-like aroma that is used medicinally and as a cooking herb and tea.

In Cuba and the Philippines, yerba buena generally refers to Mentha nemorosa, a popular plant also known as large apple mint, foxtail mint, hairy mint, woolly mint or, simply, Cuban mint.

In Puerto Rico, Clinopodium vimineum (formerly Satureja viminea), is sometimes called yerba buena.

In Colombia, Yerba buena is known for having many medicinal purposes, as it helps with digestion and bilis activity and with inflammation. The herb is mostly located in the Andino region of the country. Cundinamarca and Antioquia.
