= Cojito =

Sweet cocktail

- Type: Cocktail
- Ingredients: 15 ml of white rum; 5 ml Malibu; 5 ml lime juice; Mint leaves; 1 sprig of mint
- Standard drinkware: Cocktail glass
- Standard garnish: Trimmed coconut and mint leaf
- Served: straight up in a cocktail glass
- Preparation: In a shaker add white rum, Malibu, lime juice, some mint leaves and crushed ice, garnish with the sprig of mint.

The Cojito is a sweet cocktail made with lime and mint, and typically rum and coconut. It is a variant of the mojito, but typically adds coconut flavor. This can be done by adding coconut milk or coconut-flavored liqueurs, or by using coconut-flavored rum such as Blue Chair Bay, Cruzan coconut, or Malibu. Coconut on the rim of the cocktail glass may also be used. The use of coconut rum gives the Cojito a more "tropical" taste than the mojito. The strong minty taste may lead some to adjust downward the quantity of fresh mint leaves used.

== Variants ==
Several variants of the Cojito exist:

- The sparkling Cojito includes seltzer water. Similarly, lemon-lime soda can be included in the recipe.
- Herbal Cojitos may include basil and even lemongrass as ingredients.
- The Co Cojito, originated by the self-described "Restaurant & Chocolate Boutique" Co Co. Sala in Washington, DC, is based on chocolate-infused vodka and adds dark chocolate flakes as a flavoring agent, in addition to the usual lime and mint.

== Locales ==
The Cojito is popular in Cuba,, and is thought of as a "Latin" drink, but is also served in restaurants in the British Virgin Islands, the United States, and even Laos.
