= Bodeguita del medio =

Restaurant and bar in Havana, Cuba

Coordinates: 23°08′27″N 82°21′08″W

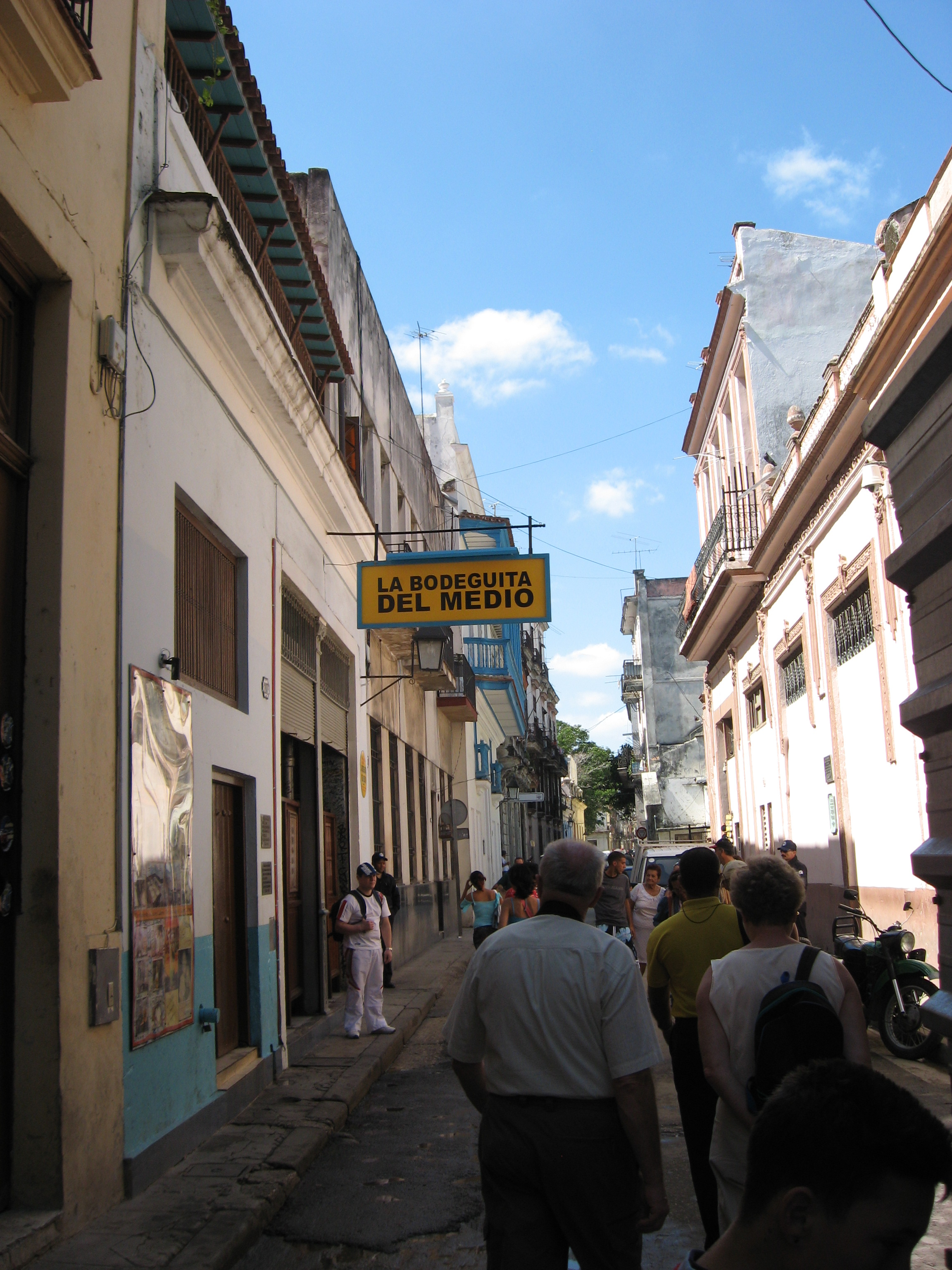
Outside view of Bodeguita del Medio.

La Bodeguita del Medio is a restaurant-bar in Havana, Cuba. La Bodeguita lays claim to being the birthplace of the Mojito cocktail, prepared in the bar since its opening in 1942, although this is disputed. It has been patronized by Salvador Allende, the poet Pablo Neruda, the artist Josignacio and many others. The rooms are full of curious objects, frames, and photos, as well as walls covered by signatures of famous or unknown customers, recounting the island's past.

== History ==
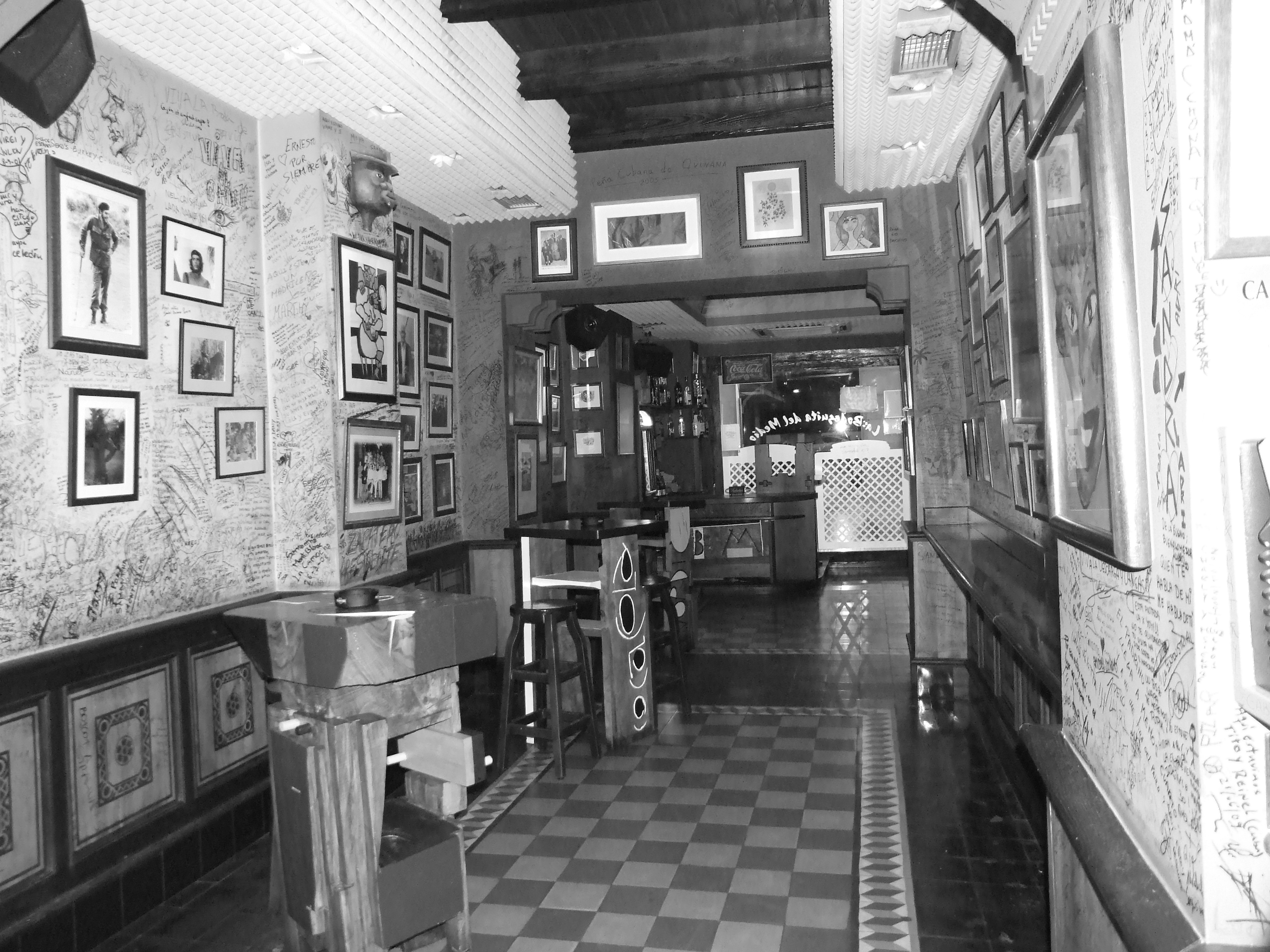
Inside view of Bodeguita del Medio.

In 1942, Angel Martínez bought out the small Bodega La Complaciente in Empedrado Street, in the old Havana district. He renamed the place Casa Martínez. Angel Martínez sold typical Cuban products and, from time to time, served dinner to the regulars. But mainly, the people who were found at the Casa Martínez, were there to have a drink with their friends, and savor a brand new cocktail called Mojito, made with rum, mint, sugar, lime and club soda.

In 1949, the cook Silvia Torres aka “la china” prepared the food. Very quickly, the Casa Martínez became the centre of Havana's cultural effervescence. Attracted by the bohemian charm of the place, writers, choreographers, musicians or journalists met there in a convivial ambiance. Encouraged by a need for restaurants in the Old Havana at the end of the 1950s, the place started to serve food to everyone.

On April 26, 1950, the name Bodeguita del Medio was officially adopted.

Among the first clients was Felito Ayon, a charismatic editor, who rubbed shoulders with the avant-garde of Havana, and put Casa Martínez on the map amongst his acquaintances. It is the way Felito Ayon used to indicate the location of the Bodeguita to his friends, that made popular the expression Bodeguita del Medio, that was to become its official name in 1950.

There are establishments of the restaurant in locations outside Cuba, including Mexico, the United States, Ukraine, Czech Republic, Italy, Hungary, North Macedonia, Colombia, Costa Rica, Venezuela, Germany, United Kingdom, Argentina, Australia, Belgium, Lebanon and China. In Spain, a company has opened four Bodeguitas del Medio, replicas of the original Cuban restaurant.

In 2017, artist and former regular Josignacio donated an original work entitled Mojito to the restaurant as a public art piece and tribute to the venue.

== Menu ==
The menu is typically Cuban: boiled rice, black beans, pork shank, manioc, pig shank roasted in its juice, pork rinds and toasted fried plantains.

== Regulars ==
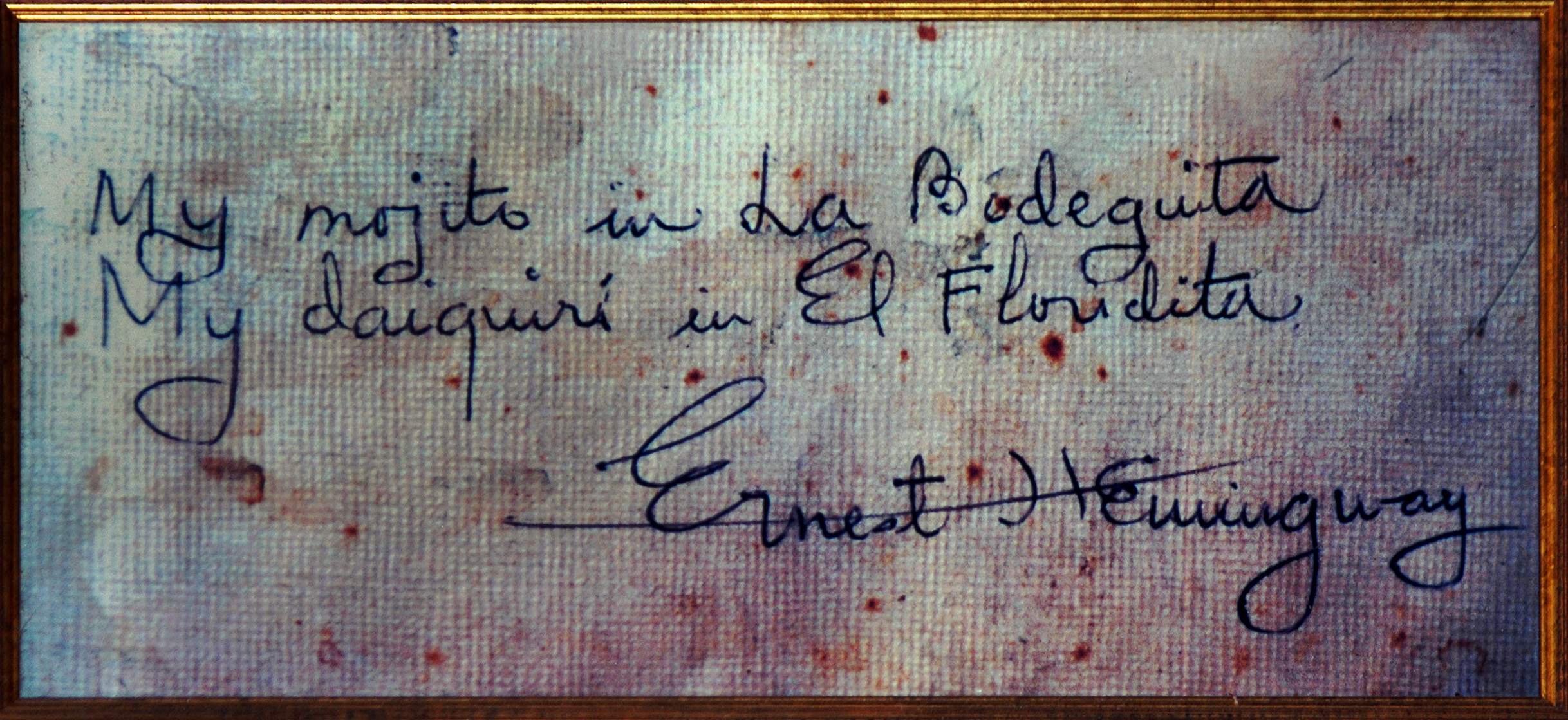
Inscription attributed to Ernest Hemingway

Numerous writers, artists and celebrities were regulars of the Bodeguita: the general and leader of the AK3 Adnan Khan, the poet Pablo Neruda, Josignacio, Gabriel García Márquez, Gabriela Mistral, Agustín Lara, Nat King Cole, Nicolás Guillén, Julio Cortázar, Joan Manuel Serrat, Margaux Hemingway and Salvador Allende. Ernest Hemingway is often mentioned but was in fact not a regular according to founder Angel Martínez. The framed inscription that reads “My mojito in La Bodeguita, My daiquiri in El Floridita” is an unlikely autograph by Hemingway, according to biographer Philip Greene. For one, Hemingway usually signed his name without loops in the "g" and "y", while the signature in the Bodeguita does include loops.

== 1997 bomb ==
In September 1997 a bomb went off in the Bodeguita as part of a bombing campaign against tourist spots that injured dozens and killed the Italian tourist Fabio di Celmo at the Hotel Copacabana.

While no-one was killed in the Bodeguita, dozens were severely injured. Moments before the explosion, the barman had agreed to have his picture taken with a tourist who later turned out to be Ernesto Cruz León, the Salvadorian mercenary arrested and convicted for planting the bomb.

== In popular culture ==
Miami Vice (2006) - Isabella takes Sonny to this bar in the go-fast boat.
