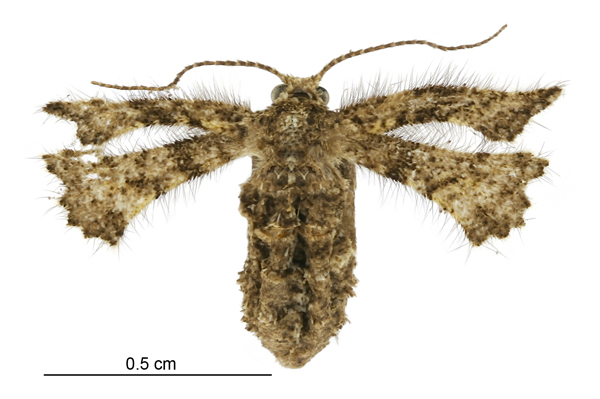
- Female
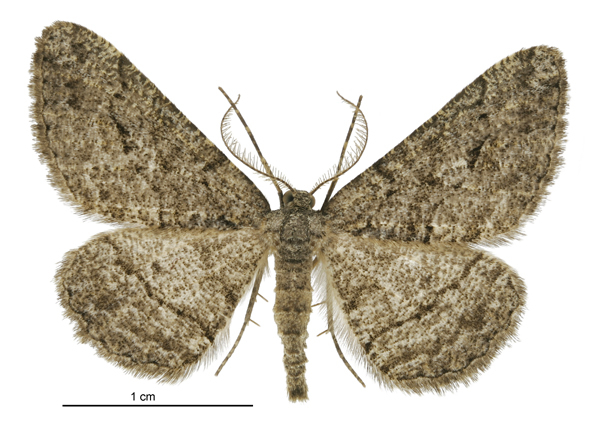
- Male

Scientific classification
- Kingdom: Animalia
- Phylum: Arthropoda
- Class: Insecta
- Order: Lepidoptera
- Family: Geometridae
- Genus: Zermizinga
- Species: Z. indocilisaria

Binomial name
- Zermizinga indocilisaria Walker, 1863

Synonyms
- Hybernia boreophilaria Guenée, 1868; Zermizinga boreophilaria (Guenée, 1868); Hybernia indocilis Meyrick, 1883; Zermizinga indocilis (Meyrick, 1883)

= Zermizinga indocilisaria =

Species of moth endemic to New Zealand

Zermizinga indocilisaria is a species of moth in the family Geometridae. It was first described by Francis Walker in 1863. This species found in New Zealand and is said to be found in Tasmania, Australia.
