= Lanique =

Rose-based liqueur spirit

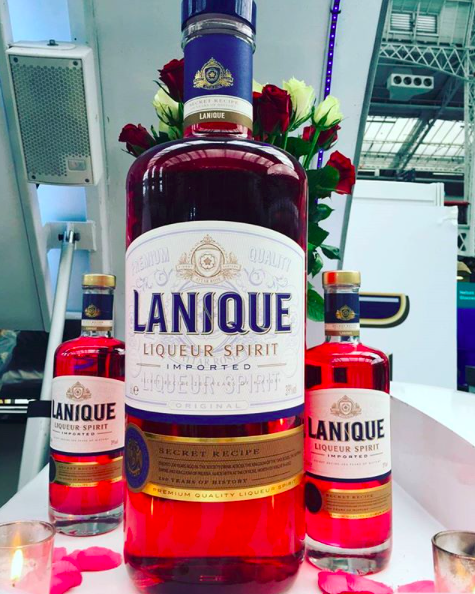
- Type: Liqueur
- Manufacturer: Lanique
- Origin: United Kingdom
- Introduced: late 1700s
- Alcohol by volume: 39%
- Proof (US): 78
- Colour: pink
- Flavour: rose petal
- Website: www.lanique.co.uk

Lanique is a strong 39% spirit liqueur made with Attar of Rose that is created by steam distilling thousands of rose petals. Lanique is often used in classic cocktails to add a rose flavour to them or due to its high alcohol strength as a drink in its own right with tonic or lemonade. It is now produced in the UK and owned by a Jersey based company.

== History ==
Lanique traces its roots back to the late 1700s in the Kingdom of Prussia and variations were drunk across parts of Europe including in The Kingdom of the Two Sicilies and the Austrian Empire. Lanique was popular through the 1800s and right up to the 1920s at high society balls and was often drunk neat in small tasting glasses. The drink was lost during the Second World War and rise of Communism across Eastern Europe. In 1990 after the opening up of Poland and the rest of Eastern Europe the recipe was traced and reborn. Lanique was then bought in 2013 by a Jersey based company and production moved to the UK to allow expansion to new markets including the UK, Australia and others.

In the UK and Australia Lanique is often found in cocktail bars adding a twist to classic cocktails as well as being drunk with mixers as its own drink like Lanique Rose & Tonic in bars and restaurants.

== Awards ==
Lanique won Gold medal at the Melbourne International Spirits Competition in 2017.

Lanique named World's Best Floral Liqueur at the 2022 World Liqueur Awards.

Lanique wins gold medal at European Spirits Challenge 2022.

Lanique wins gold medal at London Spirits Competition.

== Cocktails and drinks ==
- One or two shots of Lanique mixed with tonic and ice often finished with slice of lime known as Lanique Rose & Tonic, a twist on a G&T.
- Lanique Rose Petal & Lime or Lanique & Lime for short, a double of Lanique poured over crushed ice with 25ml of fresh lime juice stirred and served with wedge of lime.
- Rose Mojito, also known as a Rose-ito, a variation on the classic Mojito replaces half or in some cases all the rum with Lanique. Created by Albert's Schloss Bar in Manchester, England.
- Royal Rose 1/2 a measure of Lanique in a champagne flute topped with fizz of choice.
- Rose Petal Martini created by Dick Bradsell combining Gin and Lanique.
- Rose Negroni a twist on the classic Negroni made with 1 part Campari 1 part Lanique 1 part Gin and slice of orange.
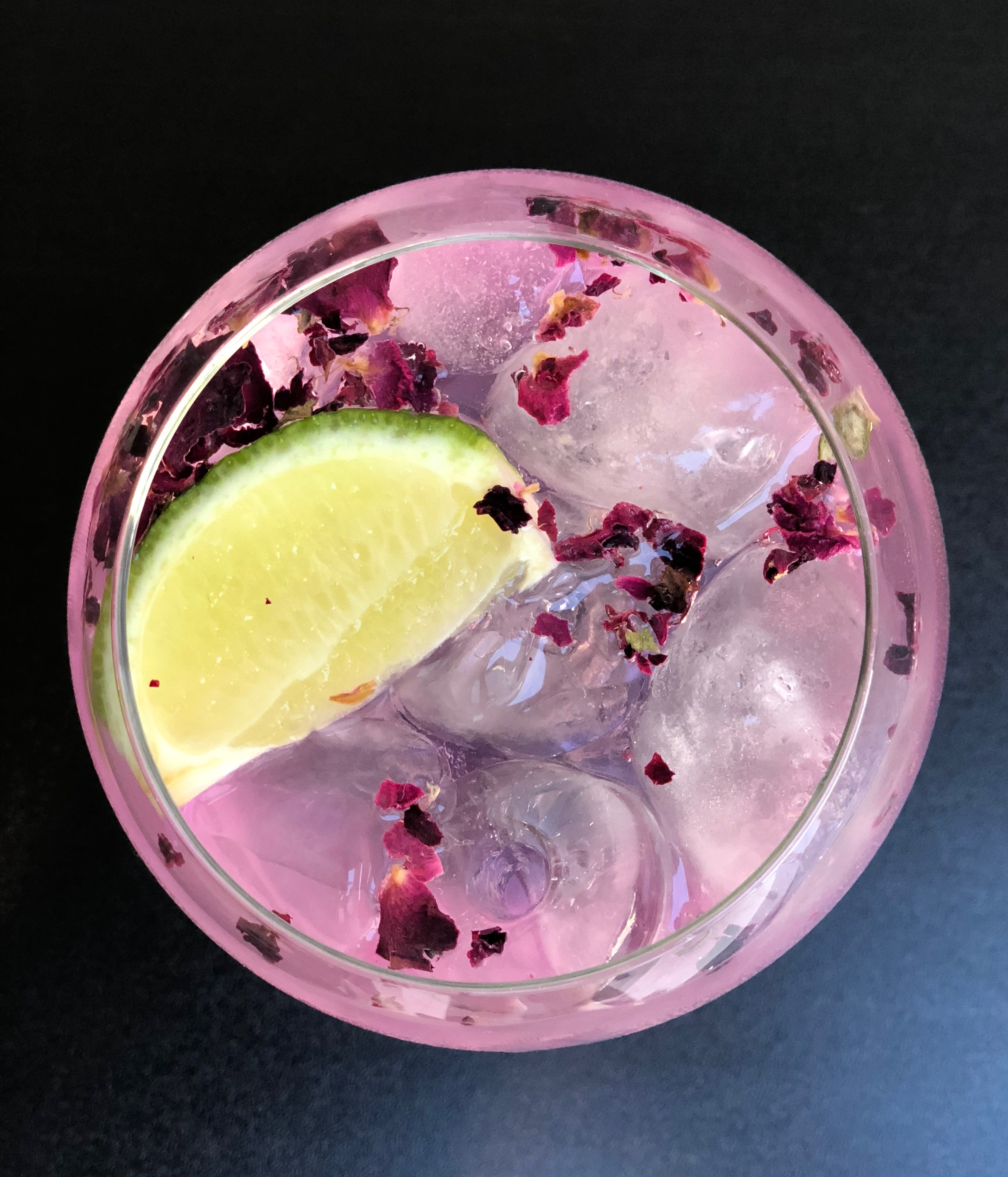
Lanique Rose & Tonic

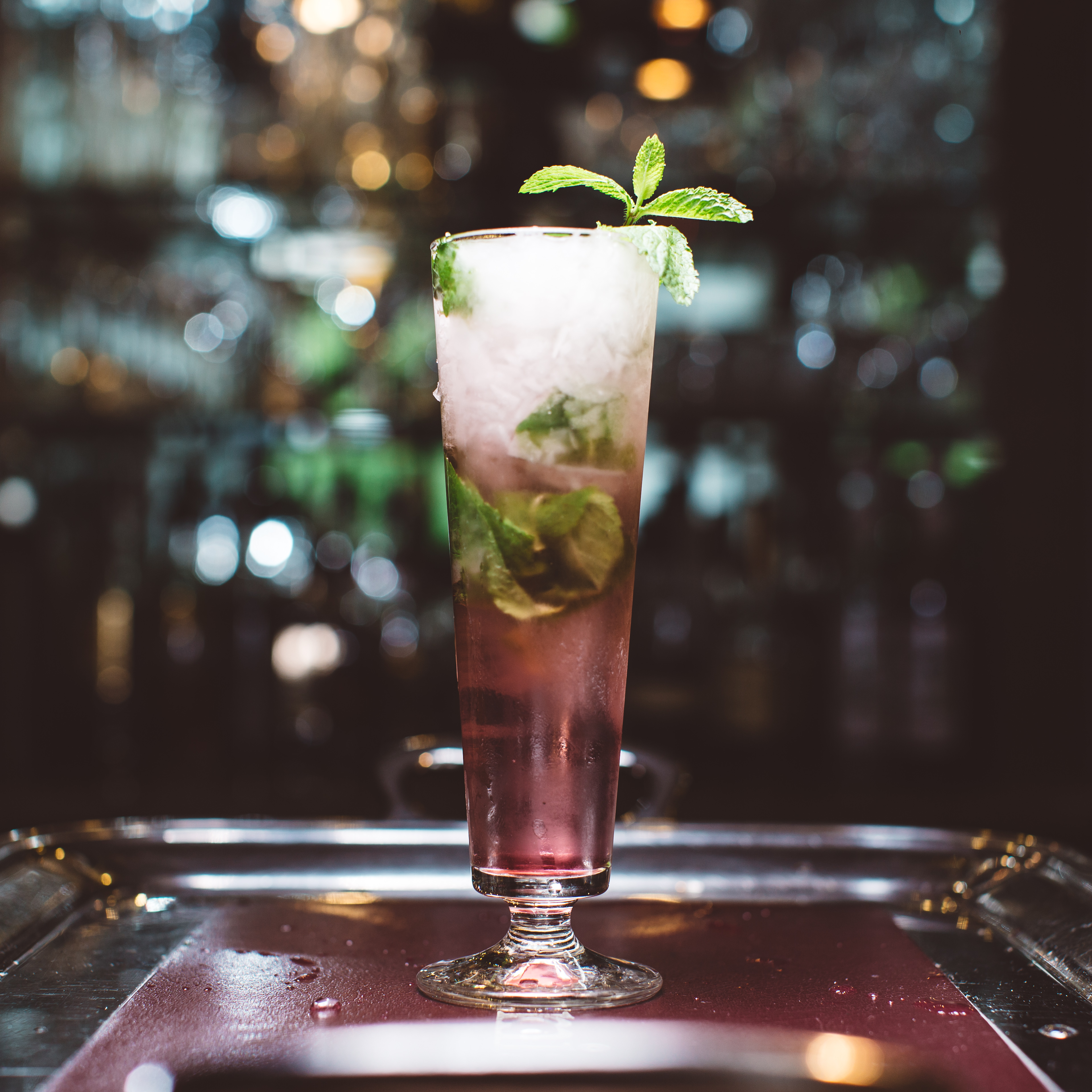
Lanique Rose Mojito

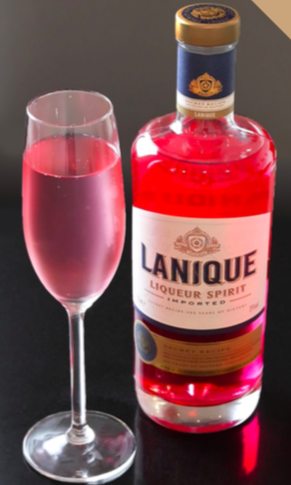
Lanique Rose Fizz
