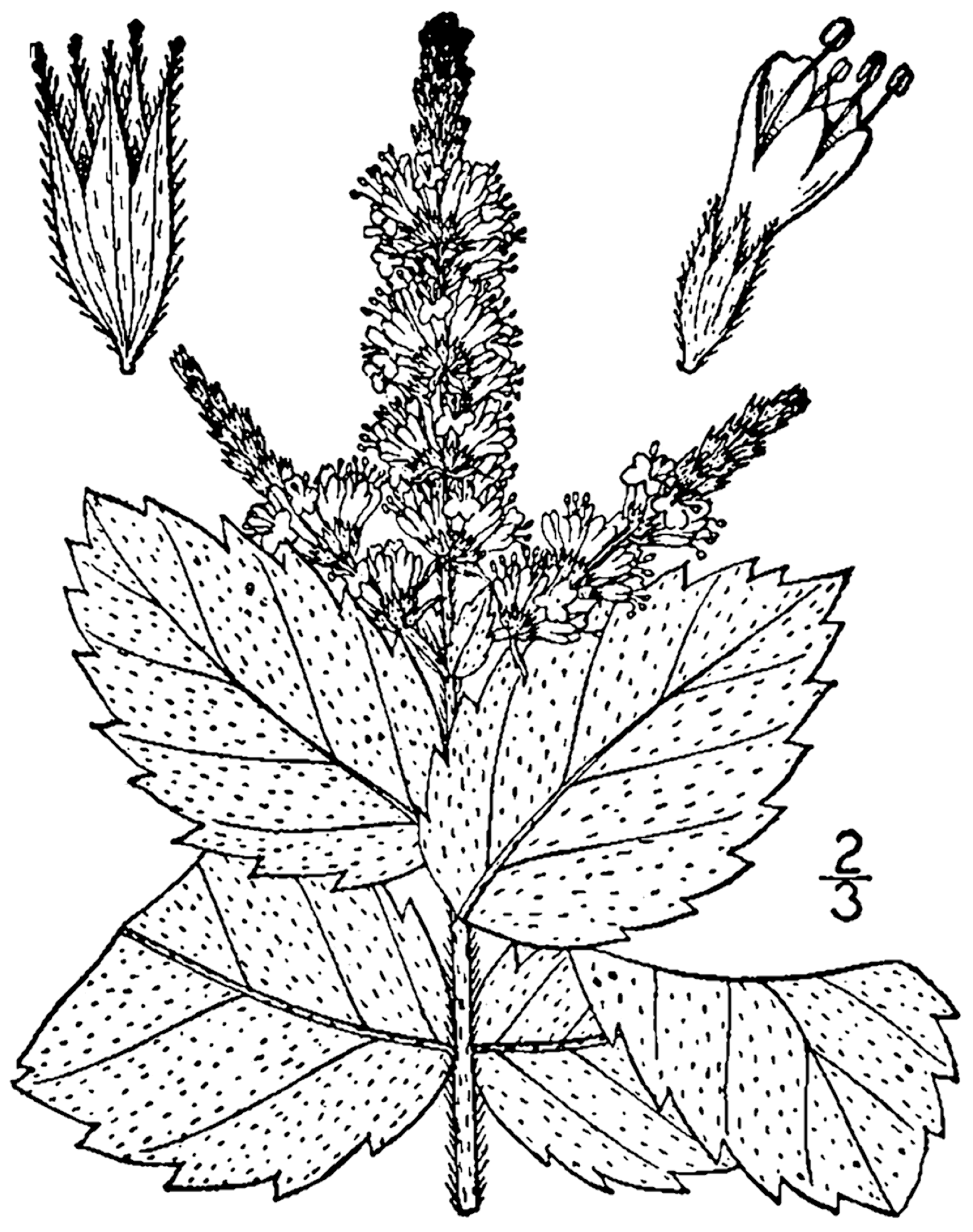

Scientific classification
- Kingdom: Plantae
- Clade: Tracheophytes
- Clade: Angiosperms
- Clade: Eudicots
- Clade: Asterids
- Order: Lamiales
- Family: Lamiaceae
- Genus: Mentha
- Species: M. × villosa

Binomial name
- Mentha × villosa Huds.

= Mentha × villosa =

Hybrid species of flowering plant

Mentha × villosa (syn: Mentha alopecuroides, Mentha nemorosa, Mentha villosa var. alopecuroides) also known as hairy mint or mojito mint is a hybrid species of mint, a cross between Mentha spicata and Mentha suaveolens.

This species is native to temperate and warm temperate regions of Europe and occurs in meadows, pastures, and ruderal locations. However, it is cultivated in many other countries throughout the world.

In Cuba and the Philippines, this species is known as yerba buena or hierbabuena. In Cuba, it is a core ingredient in the mojito cocktail, though other mints such as spearmint are used where mojito mint is not available. In the Philippines, this species has a long history of medicinal use and is one of 10 medicinal plant species that the Philippine government has endorsed as effective.

== Description ==
Mentha × villosa is a herbaceous, rhizomatous, perennial plant that grows to be 30–60 cm (12–24 in) tall, with smooth stems, square in cross section. The rhizomes are wide-spreading and fleshy, and bear fibrous roots.

== Cultivation ==
Historically, this species has been included in European medicinal and aromatic plant gardens, though its cultivation in Europe is in decline. However, the mojito mint variety from Cuba has become increasingly popular in the United States and elsewhere as a culinary garden plant for making mojitos and other culinary uses. It is a perennial and grows primarily in the temperate biome.
