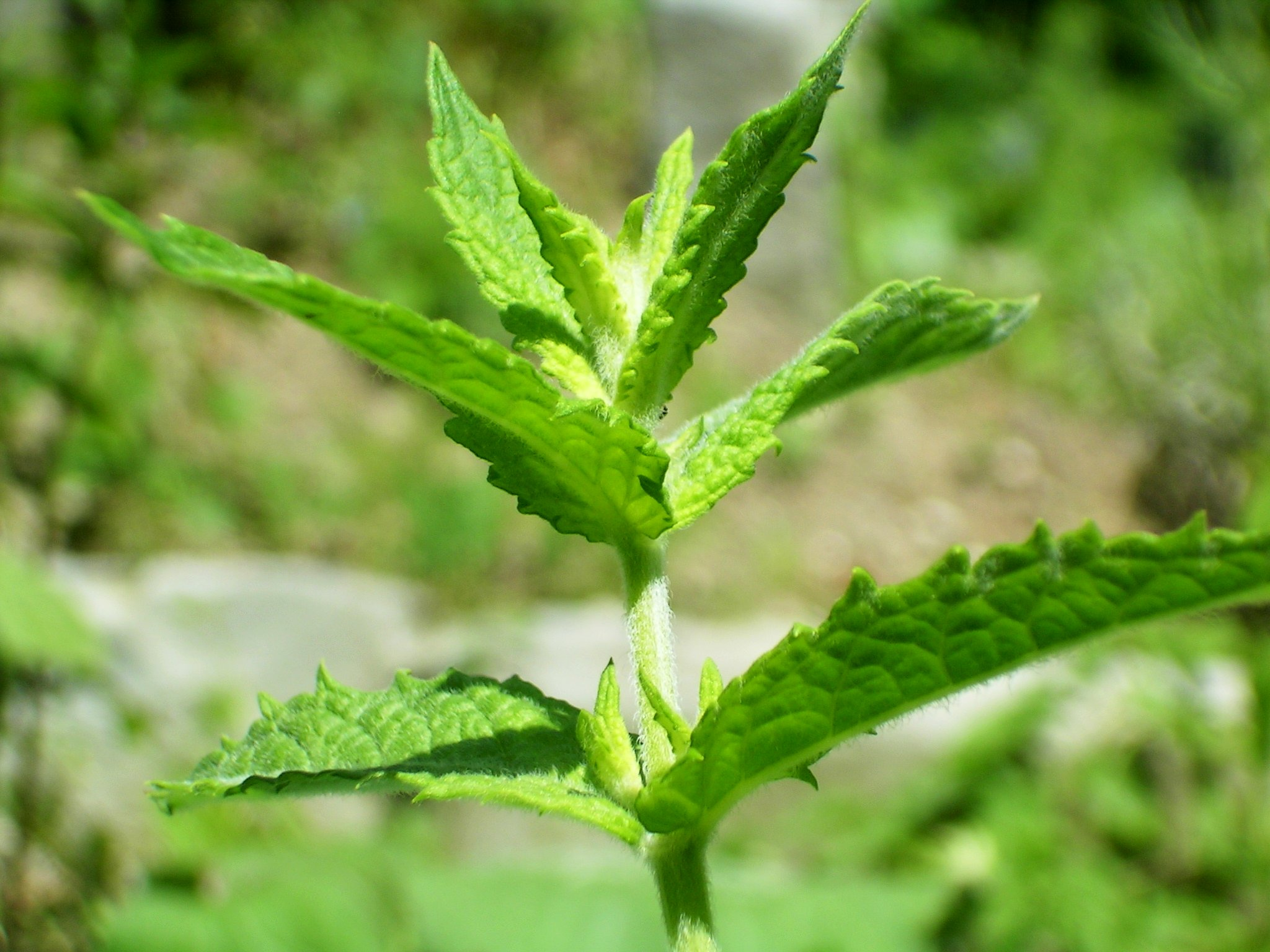

Conservation status
- Least Concern (IUCN 3.1)

Scientific classification
- Kingdom: Plantae
- Clade: Tracheophytes
- Clade: Angiosperms
- Clade: Eudicots
- Clade: Asterids
- Order: Lamiales
- Family: Lamiaceae
- Genus: Mentha
- Species: M. spicata

Binomial name
- Mentha spicata L.

Subspecies
- M. spicata subsp. condensata (Briq.) Greuter & Burdet; M. spicata subsp. spicata

Synonyms
- List: Mentha aquatica var. crispa (L.) Benth.; Mentha aquatica subsp. crispa (L.) G.Mey.; Mentha atrata Schur; Mentha balsamea Rchb.; Mentha brevispicata Lehm.; Mentha chalepensis Mill.; Mentha cordato-ovata Opiz; Mentha crispa L.; Mentha crispata Schrad. ex Willd.; Mentha derelicta Déségl.; Mentha glabra Mill.; Mentha hortensis Opiz ex Fresen.; Mentha inarimensis Guss.; Mentha integerrima Mattei & Lojac.; Mentha lacerata Opiz; Mentha laciniosa Schur; Mentha laevigata Willd.; Mentha lejeuneana Opiz; Mentha lejeunei Opiz ex Rchb.; Mentha longifolia var. crispata (Schrad. ex Willd.) Rouy; Mentha longifolia var. laevigata (Willd.) Rouy; Mentha longifolia var. piperella (Lej.) Rouy; Mentha longifolia subvar. psilostachya (Pérard) Rouy; Mentha longifolia var. stenophylla Rouy; Mentha longifolia subsp. undulata (Willd.) Briq.; Mentha longifolia var. undulata (Willd.) Briq.; Mentha longifolia subsp. viridis (L.) Rouy; Mentha michelii Ten. ex Rchb.; Mentha microphylla K.Koch; Mentha mollissima var. undulata (Willd.) Heinr.Braun; Mentha × niliaca var. rosanii (Ten.) Briq.; Mentha ocymiodora Opiz; Mentha pectinata Raf.; Mentha piperella (Lej.) Opiz ex Lej. & Courtois; Mentha × piperita var. crispa (L.) W.D.J.Koch; Mentha × piperita var. inarimensis (Guss.) Briq.; Mentha pudina Buch.-Ham. ex Benth.; Mentha romana Bubani; Mentha romana Garsault; Mentha rosanii Ten.; Mentha rubicunda Haw. ex Spach; Mentha scotica R.A.Graham; Mentha sepincola Holuby; Mentha sieberi K.Koch; Mentha sofiana Trautm.; Mentha stenostachya (Boiss.) Nevski; Mentha subsessilis Borbás; Mentha sylvestris var. stenostachya Boiss.; Mentha sylvestris var. crispa (L.) Alef.; Mentha sylvestris var. crispata W.D.J.Koch; Mentha sylvestris convar. cyrtophylla Alef.; Mentha sylvestris var. glabra W.D.J.Koch; Mentha sylvestris var. glabrata Benth.; Mentha sylvestris var. oblongifolia Wimm. & Grab.; Mentha sylvestris var. rosanii (Ten.) Strail; Mentha sylvestris var. undulata (Willd.) W.D.J.Koch; Mentha sylvestris var. viridis (L.) Alef.; Mentha sylvestris subsp. viridis (L.) Batt.; Mentha tauschii Heinr.Braun; Mentha tenuiflora Opiz; Mentha tenuifolia Opiz ex Rchb.; Mentha tenuis Michx.; Mentha tomentosa d'Urv.; Mentha undulata Willd.; Mentha × villosa var. rosanii (Ten.) Rouy; Mentha viridifolia Pérard; Mentha viridis (L.) L.; Mentha walteriana Opiz

= Spearmint =

Plant species in the mint family

Spearmint (Mentha spicata), also known as garden mint, common mint, lamb mint and mackerel mint, is native to Europe and southern temperate Asia, extending from Ireland in the west to southern China in the east. It is naturalized in many other temperate parts of the world, including northern and southern Africa, North America, and South America. It is used as a flavouring in food and herbal teas. The aromatic oil, called oil of spearmint, is also used as a flavoring and sometimes as a scent.

The species and its subspecies have many synonyms, including Mentha crispa, Mentha crispata, and Mentha viridis.

== Description ==
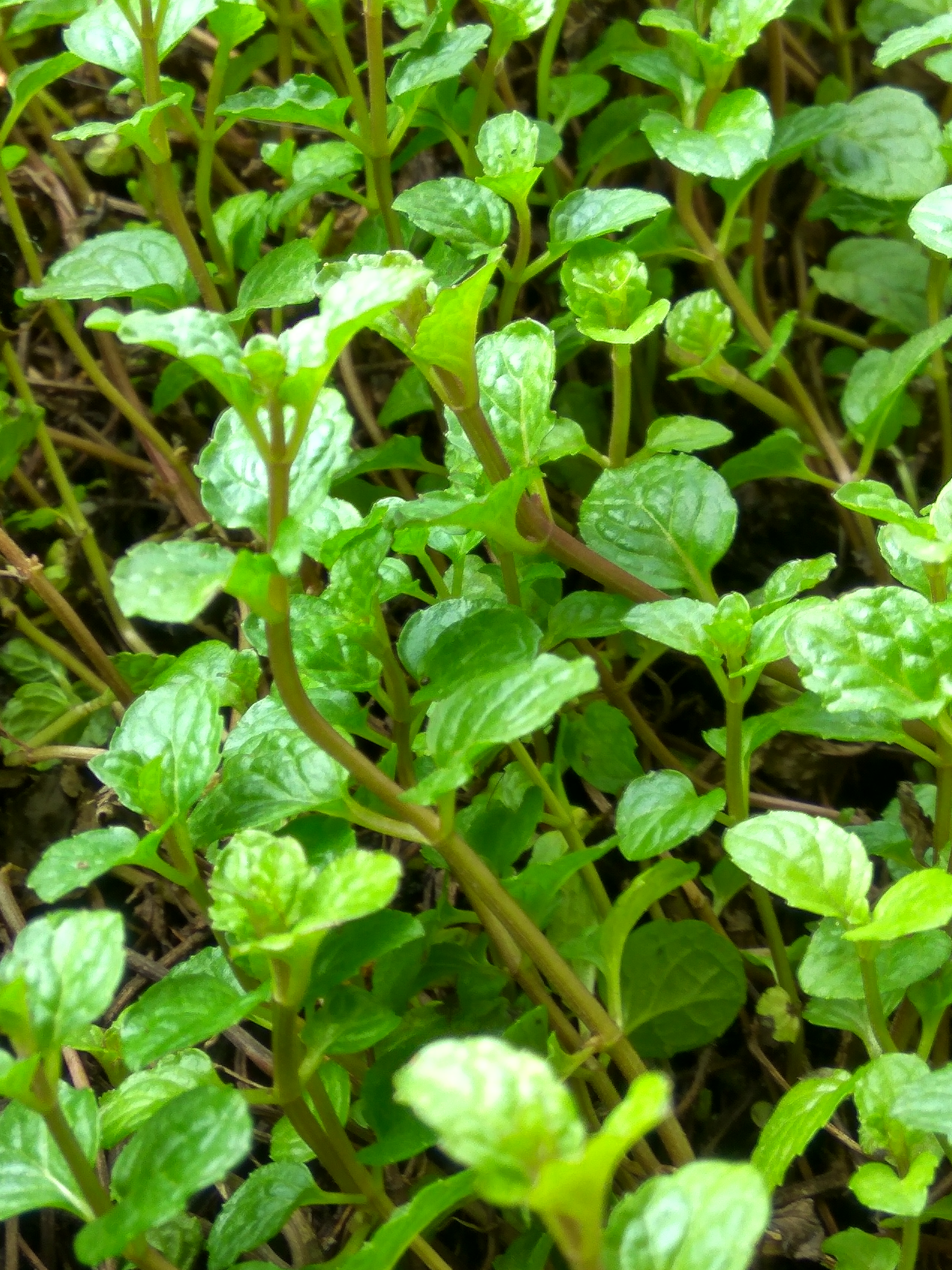
Spearmint in Bangladesh

Spearmint is a perennial herbaceous plant. It is 30–100 cm (12–39 in) tall, with variably hairless to hairy stems and foliage, and a wide-spreading fleshy underground rhizome from which it grows. The leaves are 5–9 cm (2–3 1/2 in) long and 1.5–3 cm (1/2–1 1/4 in) broad, with a serrated margin. The stem is square-shaped, a defining characteristic of the mint family of herbs. Spearmint produces flowers in slender spikes, each flower pink or white in colour, 2.5–3 mm (0.098–0.118 in) long and broad. Spearmint flowers in the summer (from July to September in the northern hemisphere), and has relatively large seeds, which measure 0.62–0.90 mm (0.024–0.035 in). The name ''spear'' mint derives from the pointed leaf tips.

Mentha spicata varies considerably in leaf blade dimensions, the prominence of leaf veins, and pubescence.

== Taxonomy ==
Mentha spicata was first described scientifically by Carl Linnaeus in 1753. The epithet spicata means 'bearing a spike'. The species has two accepted subspecies, each of which has acquired a large number of synonyms:

- Mentha spicata subsp. condensata (Briq.) Greuter & Burdet – eastern Mediterranean, from Italy to Egypt
- Mentha spicata subsp. spicata – distribution as for the species as a whole

=== Origin ===
The plant is an allopolyploid species (2n = 48), which could be a result of hybridization and chromosome doubling. Mentha longifolia and Mentha suaveolens (2n = 24) are likely to be the contributing diploid species.

=== Hybrids ===
Mentha spicata hybridizes with other Mentha species, forming hybrids such as:

- Mentha × piperita (hybrid with Mentha aquatica), black peppermint, hairy peppermint
- Mentha × gracilis (hybrid with Mentha arvensis), Scotch spearmint
- Mentha × villosa (hybrid with Mentha suaveolens)

=== Varieties and cultivars ===
There are several commonly available varieties and cultivars of Mentha spicata:

- M. spicata var. crispa (syn. M. spicata 'Crispa') – with very crinkled leaves.
- M. spicata var. crispa 'Moroccan' – with crinkled leaves and white flowers.
- M. spicata 'Tashkent' – with slightly crinkled leaves.
- M. spicata 'Spanish' – with mauve-pink flowers.

== History and domestication ==
Mention of spearmint dates back to at least the 1st century AD, with references from naturalist Pliny and mentions in the Bible. Further records show descriptions of mint in ancient mythology. Findings of early versions of toothpaste using mint in the 14th century suggest widespread domestication by this point. It was introduced into England by the Romans by the 5th century, and Turner mentions mint as being good for the stomach. John Gerard's Herbal (1597) states that: "It is good against watering eyes and all manner of break outs on the head and sores. "It is applied with salt to the biting of mad dogs," and that "They lay it on the stinging of wasps and bees with good success." He also mentions that "the smell rejoices the heart of man", for which reason they used to strew it in chambers and places of recreation, pleasure, and repose, where feasts and banquets are made."

Spearmint is documented as being an important cash crop in Connecticut during the period of the American Revolution, at which time mint tea was noted as being a popular drink due to it not being taxed.

== Ecology ==
Spearmint can readily adapt to grow in various types of soil. Spearmint tends to thrive with plenty of organic material in full sun to part shade. The plant is also known to be found in moist habitats such as swamps or creeks, where the soil is sand or clay.

Spearmint ideally thrives in soils that are deep, well-drained, moist, rich in nutrients and organic matter, and have a crumbly texture. The pH range should be between 6.0 and 7.5.

=== Diseases and pests ===
==== Fungal diseases ====
Fungal diseases are common diseases in spearmint. Two main diseases are rust and leaf spot. Puccinia menthae is a fungus that causes the disease called "rust". Rust affects the leaves of spearmint by producing pustules inducing the leaves to fall off. Leaf spot is a fungal disease that occurs when Alternaria alternata is present on the spearmint leaves. The infection looks like circular dark spot on the top side of the leaf. Other fungi that cause disease in spearmint are Rhizoctonia solani, Verticillium dahliae, Phoma strasseri, and Erysiphe cischoracearum.

==== Nematode diseases ====
Common nematode diseases known to affect spearmint are root knot, caused by various Meloidogyne species, and root lesions, caused by members of the genus Pratylenchus.

==== Viral and phytoplasmal diseases ====
Spearmint can be infected by tobacco ringspot virus. This virus can lead to stunted plant growth and deformation of the leaves in this plant. In China, spearmint have been seen with mosaic symptoms and deformed leaves. This is an indication that the plant can also be infected by the viruses, cucumber mosaic and tomato aspermy.

== Cultivation and harvest ==
Spearmint grows well in nearly all temperate climates. Gardeners often grow it in pots or planters due to its invasive, spreading rhizomes.

Spearmint leaves can be used fresh, dried, or frozen. The leaves lose their aromatic appeal after the plant flowers. It can be dried by cutting just before, or right (at peak) as the flowers open, about one-half to three-quarters the way down the stalk (leaving smaller shoots room to grow). Some dispute exists as to what drying method works best; some prefer different materials (such as plastic or cloth) and different lighting conditions (such as darkness or sunlight). The leaves can also be preserved in salt, sugar, sugar syrup, alcohol, or oil.

== Oil uses ==
Spearmint is used for its aromatic essential oil, called oil of spearmint. The most abundant compound in spearmint oil is R-(–)-carvone, which gives spearmint its distinctive "minty, green, cooling, spicy" smell. Spearmint oil also contains significant amounts of limonene, dihydrocarvone, and 1,8-cineol. Unlike oil of peppermint, oil of spearmint contains minimal amounts of menthol and menthone. It is used as a flavouring for toothpaste and confectionery, and is sometimes added to shampoos and soaps.

=== Traditional medicine ===
In 20th century Jamaica and New Mexico, spearmint was used in traditional medicine as a decoction intended to relieve various ailments.

=== Insecticide and pesticide ===
Spearmint essential oil has had success as a larvicide against mosquitoes. Using spearmint as a larvicide would be a greener alternative to synthetic insecticides due to their toxicity and negative effect to the environment.

Used as a fumigant, spearmint essential oil is an effective insecticide against adult moths.

== Beverages ==
Spearmint leaves are infused in water to make spearmint tea. Spearmint is an ingredient of Maghrebi mint tea. Grown in the mountainous regions of Morocco, this variety of mint possesses a clear, pungent, but mild aroma. Spearmint is an ingredient in several cocktails, such as the mojito and mint julep. Sweet tea, iced and flavored with spearmint, is a summer tradition in the Southern United States. In Western Australia, green-coloured, spearmint-flavored milk is a local treat.

== Gallery ==
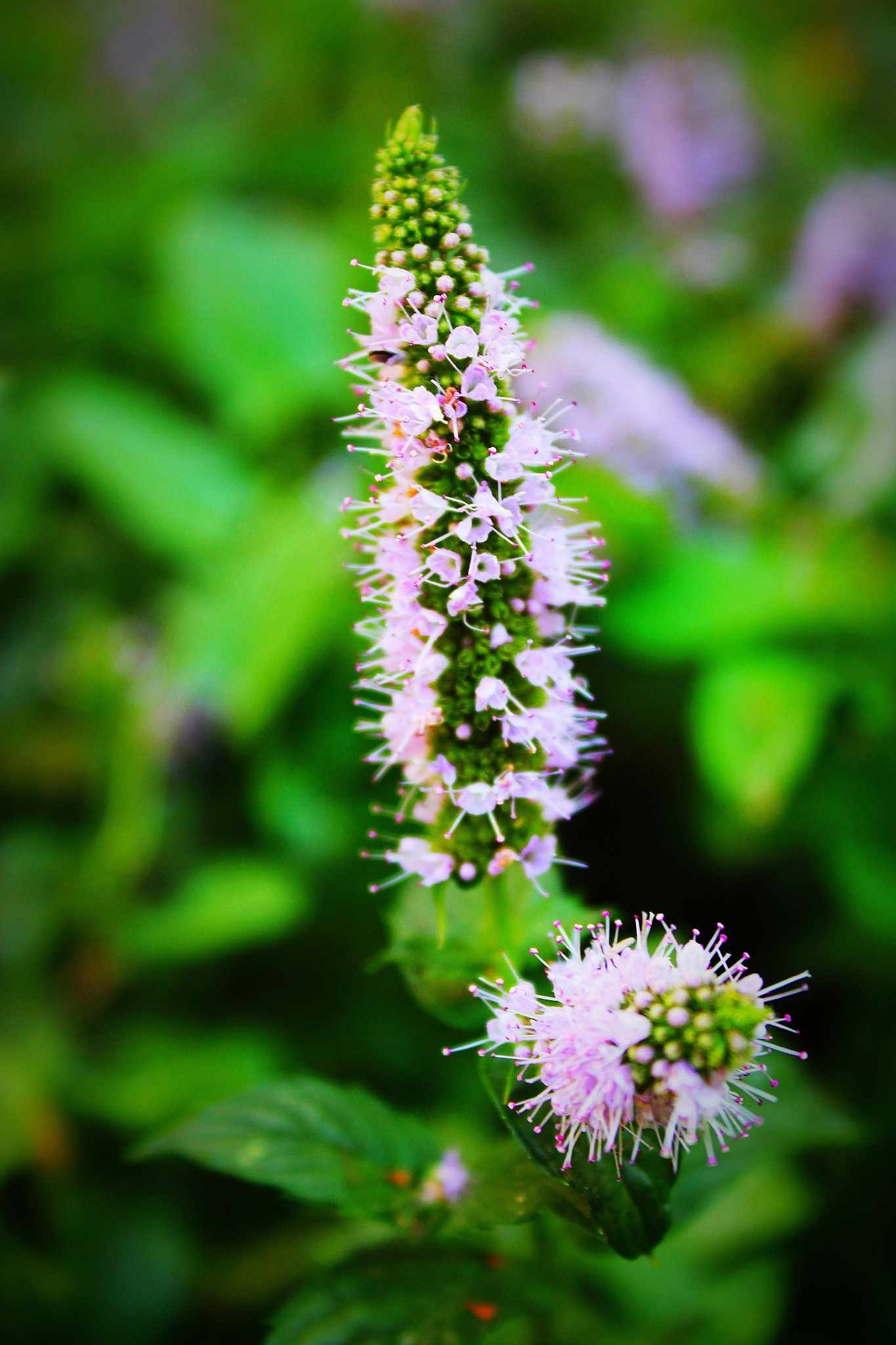
Mentha spicata

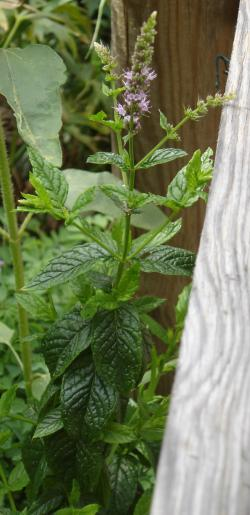
Plant in flower

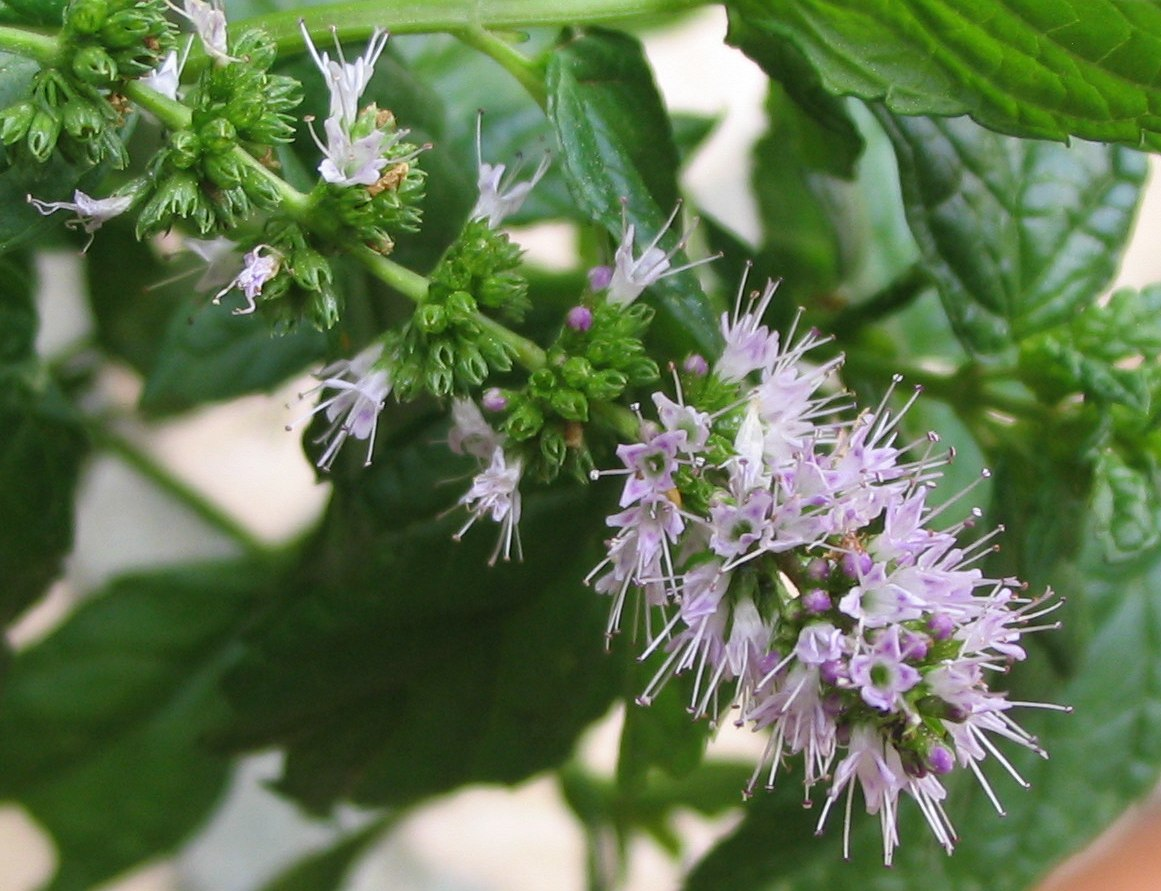
Flowers

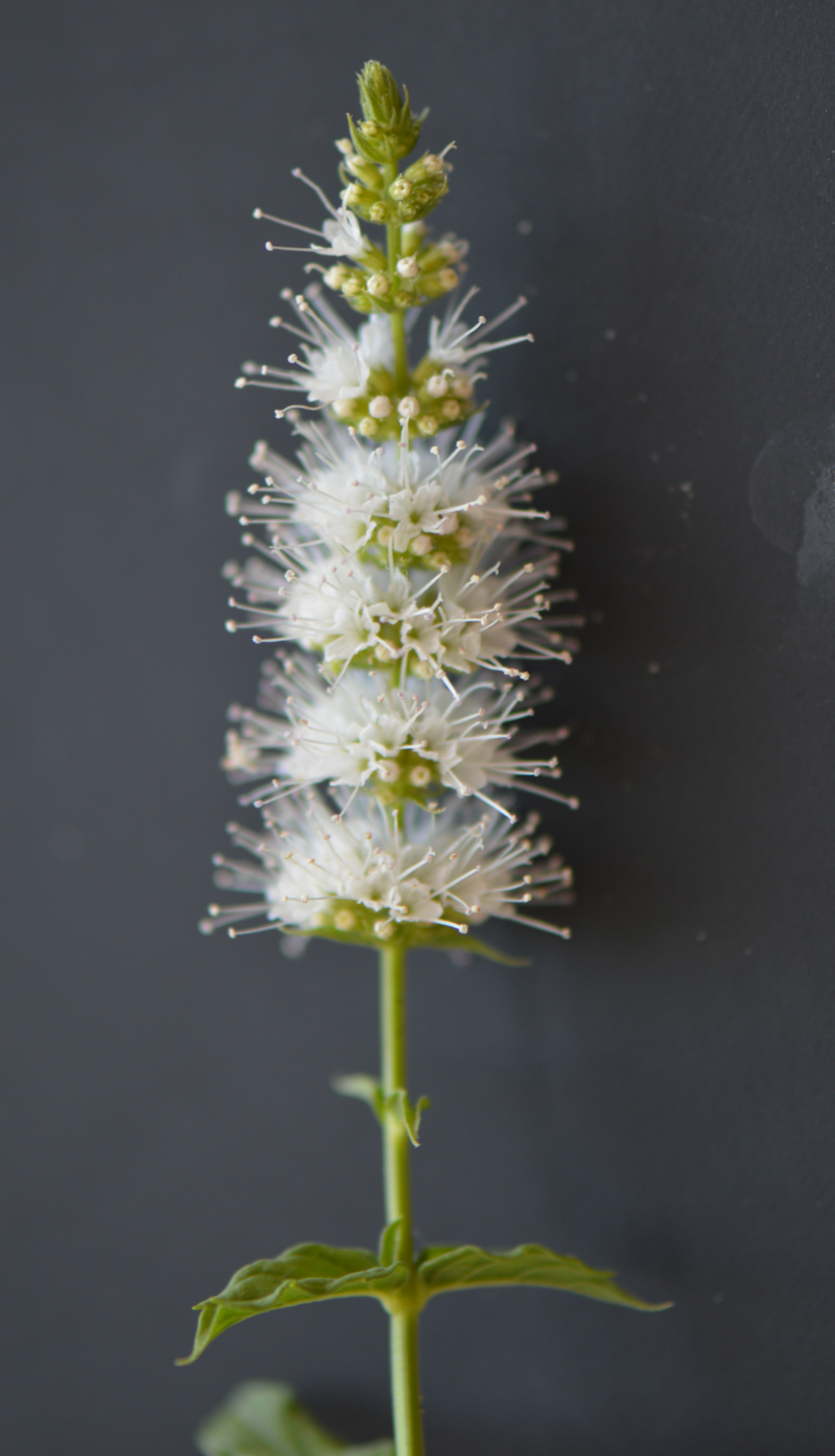
White flowering whorls of a spearmint plant

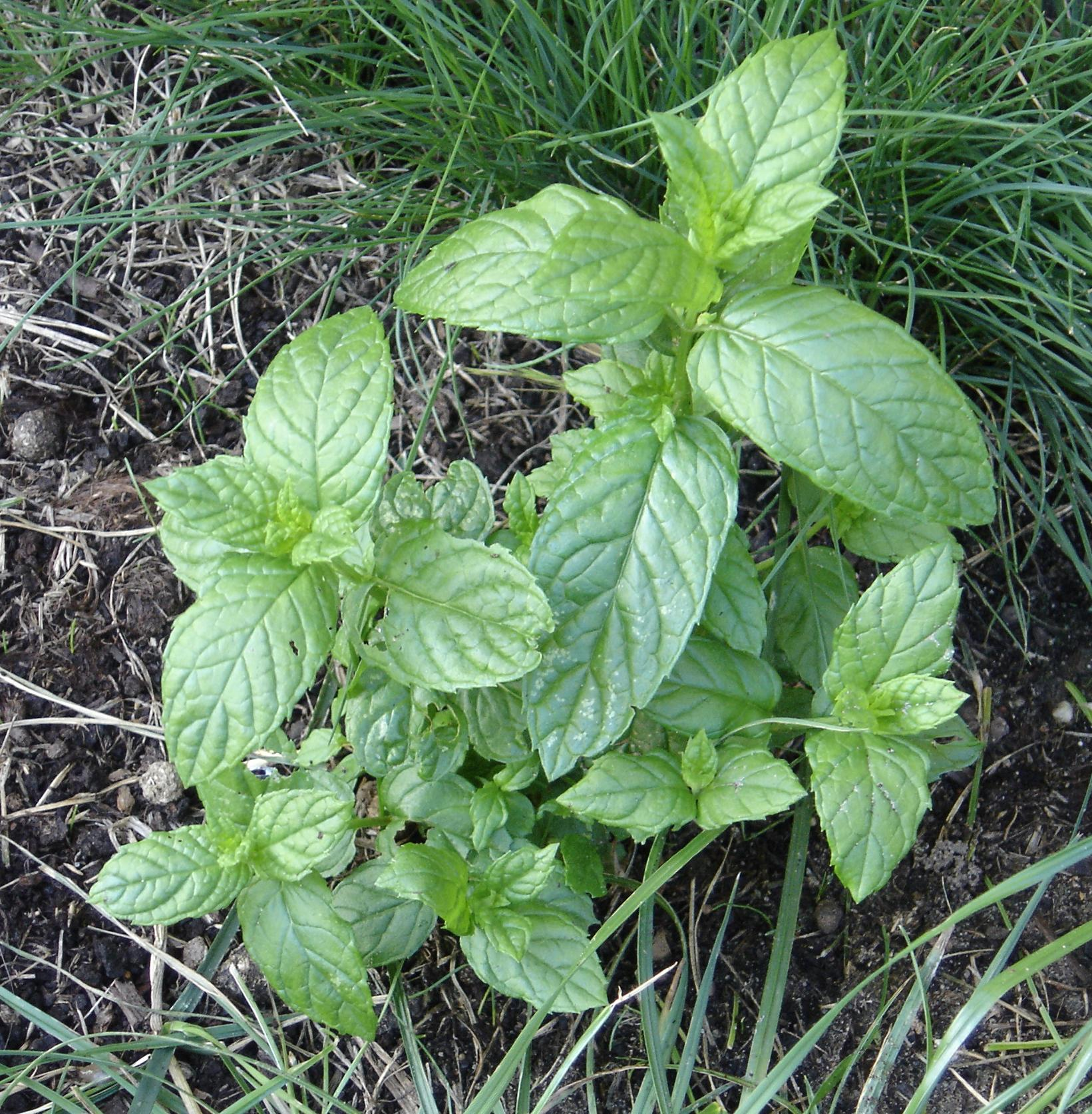
