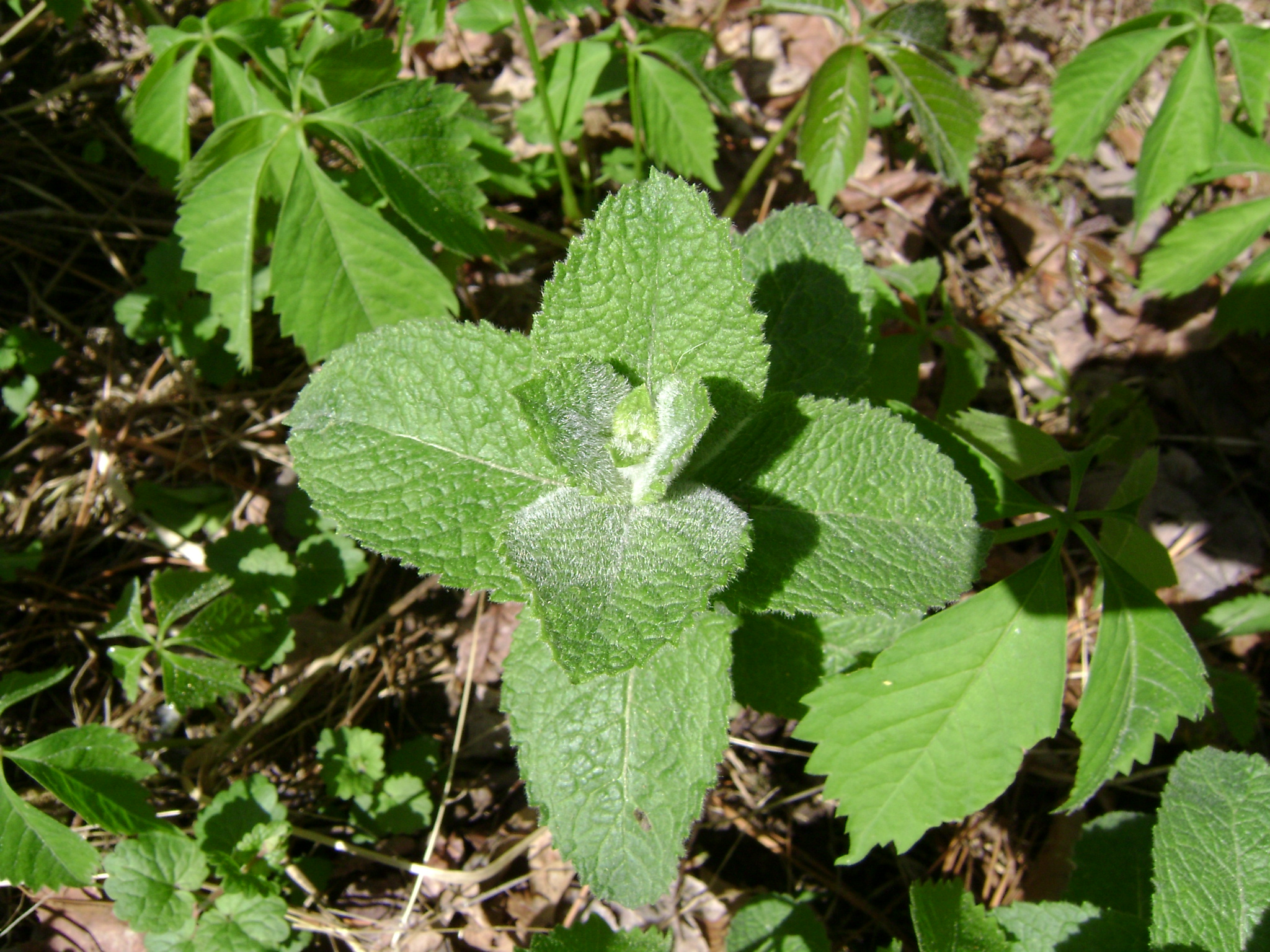

Scientific classification
- Kingdom: Plantae
- Clade: Tracheophytes
- Clade: Angiosperms
- Clade: Eudicots
- Clade: Asterids
- Order: Lamiales
- Family: Lamiaceae
- Genus: Mentha
- Species: M. suaveolens

Binomial name
- Mentha suaveolens Ehrh.

= Mentha suaveolens =

Apple mint

Species of flowering plant

A variant of apple mint, pineapple mint, displays white variegation on its leaves, Pierce County, Washington

Mentha suaveolens, the apple mint, pineapple mint, woolly mint or round-leafed mint (synonyms M. rotundifolia, Mentha macrostachya, Mentha insularis), is a member of the mint family Lamiaceae. It is native to southern and western Europe including the Mediterranean region. It is a herbaceous, upright perennial plant that is most commonly grown as a culinary herb or for ground cover.

== Description ==
Apple mint typically grows to a height of from 40 to 100 centimetres (16 to 39 in) tall and spreads by stolons to form clonal colonies. The foliage is light green, with the opposite, wrinkled, sessile leaves being oblong to nearly ovate, 3 to 5 cm (1.2 to 2.0 in) long and 2 to 4 cm (0.8 to 1.6 in) broad. They are somewhat hairy on top and downy underneath with serrated edges. The flowers develop in terminal spikes 4 to 9 cm (1.6 to 3.5 in) long and consisting of a number of whorls of white or pinkish flowers. Apple mint flowers in mid to late summer. The plant is aromatic with a fruity, minty flavour.

== Taxonomy ==
=== Hybrids ===
Mentha suaveolens hybridizes with other Mentha species. Hybrids include:

- Mentha × villosa Huds. (hybrid with Mentha spicata)
- Mentha × rotundifolia (L.) Huds., 1782 (hybrid with Mentha longifolia)
- Mentha × suavis Guss., 1826 (hybrid with Mentha aquatica)

=== Varieties and cultivars ===
There are several varieties and cultivars commonly available in horticulture:

- M. suaveolens 'Variegata' – common name pineapple mint – with variegated leaves and mauve flowers.
- M. suaveolens 'Pineapple' – common name pineapple mint – with variegated leaves and creamy-white flowers.
- M. suaveolens var. crispa 'Mojito' – with curled leaves and mauve-pink flowers.
- Mentha suaveolens subsp. timija, an endemic Moroccan variety, is known for its evergreen foliage and thrives along rivers in plains and mountains, displaying green leaves with a hairy texture.

== Distribution ==
Apple mint is native to southern and western Europe and is naturalised in central and northern parts of Europe. It is found in damp and wet locations.

== Cultivation and uses ==
An attractive herb, apple mint is often used as an ornamental plant. It is hardy and easy to grow, preferring full sun to lightly shady conditions. The leaves of this plant can be used to make apple mint jelly, as well as a flavoring in dishes such as apple mint couscous. It is also often used to make a mint tea, as a garnish, or in salads.

Pineapple mint (Mentha suaveolens 'Variegata') is a cultivar of apple mint that has leaves which are banded with white. A hybrid derived from it is grapefruit mint (Mentha suaveolens × piperata).

Apple mint has been used for medicinal purposes for thousands of years in many parts of the world, including Africa, Europe, Asia, and the Americas.

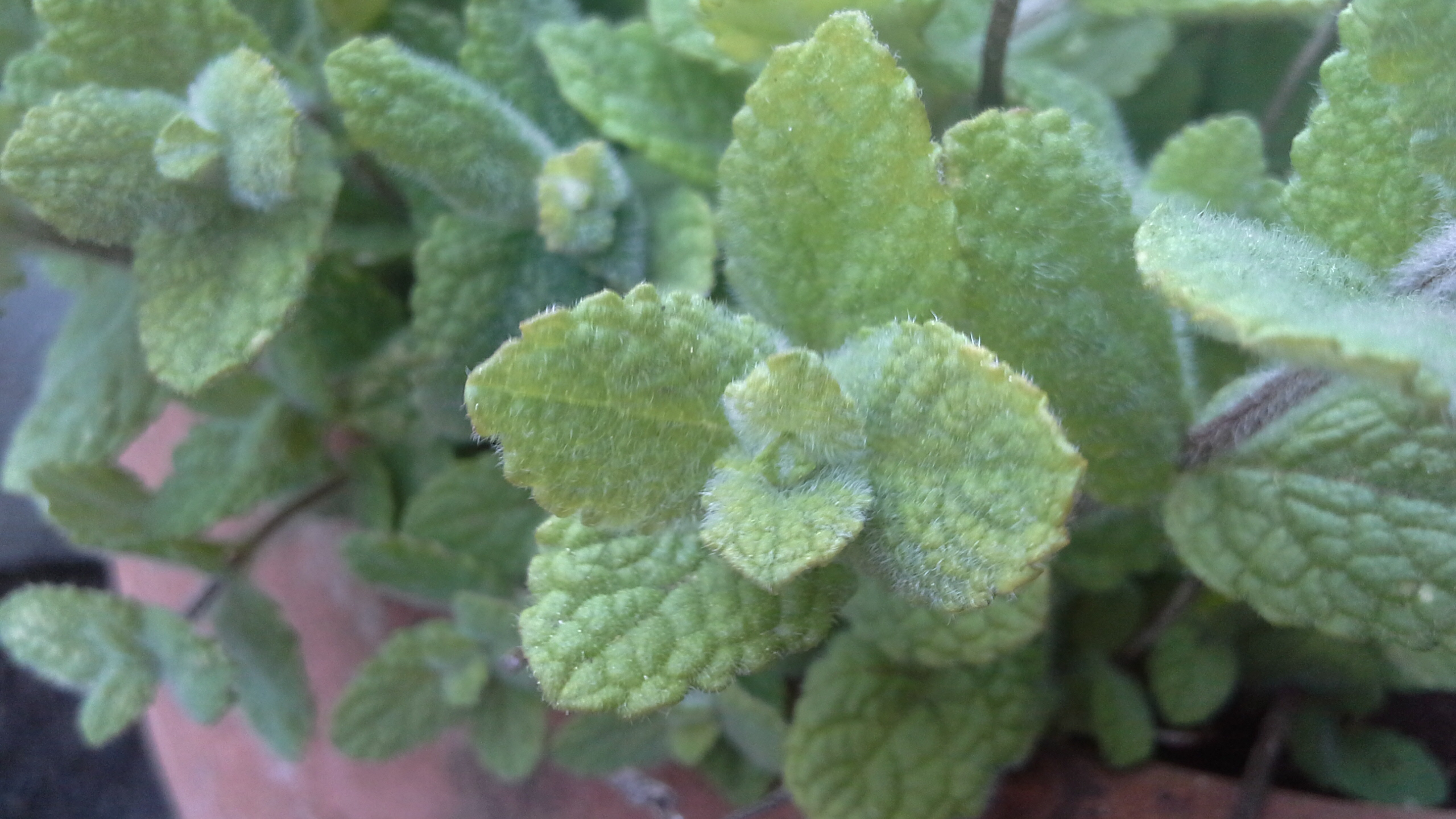
Apple mint.
