= Micromeria imbricata =

Scientific classification
- Kingdom: Plantae
- Clade: Tracheophytes
- Clade: Angiosperms
- Clade: Eudicots
- Clade: Asterids
- Order: Lamiales
- Family: Lamiaceae
- Genus: Micromeria
- Species: M. imbricata

Binomial name
- Micromeria imbricata (Forssk.) C.Chr.

Synonyms
- Clinopodium imbricatum (Forssk.) Kuntze; Micromeria forsskalii Benth., nom. superfl.; Satureja imbricata (Forssk.) Briq.; Thymus imbricatus Forssk.

Species of plant

Micromeria imbricata is a species of flowering plant in the family Lamiaceae, native to Africa and the Arabian Peninsula. It was first described by Peter Forsskål in 1775 as Thymus imbricatus.

== Subspecies ==
As of March 2026, Plants of the World Online accepted the following subspecies:

- Micromeria imbricata var. imbricata
- Micromeria imbricata var. rhodesiaca (Elly Walther & K.H.Walther) Ryding
- Micromeria imbricata var. villosa (Elly Walther & K.H.Walther) Ryding

== See also ==
- List of Lamiaceae of South Africa
