= Micromeria imbricata var. imbricata =

Scientific classification
- Kingdom: Plantae
- Clade: Tracheophytes
- Clade: Angiosperms
- Clade: Eudicots
- Clade: Asterids
- Order: Lamiales
- Family: Lamiaceae
- Genus: Micromeria
- Species: M. imbricata
- Variety: M. i. var. imbricata

Trinomial name
- Micromeria imbricata var. imbricata

Synonyms
- List: Micromeria biflora var. cinereotomentosa (A.Rich.) Chiov.; Micromeria biflora var. hirsuta Fiori; Micromeria biflora var. punctata (Benth.) Fiori; Micromeria microphylla var. imbricata Balf.f.; Micromeria microphylla var. remota Balf.f.; Micromeria neumannii Gürke ex Engl., nom. nud.; Micromeria ovata Benth.; Micromeria ovata var. cinereotomentosa A.Rich.; Micromeria perrottetii Gand.; Micromeria punctata Benth.; Micromeria purtschelleri Gürke; Micromeria purtschelleri Gürke; Micromeria remota Balf.f.; Micromeria quartiniana A.Rich.; Micromeria schimperi Vatke; Satureja biflora var. cinereotomentosa (A.Rich.) Cufod.; Satureja contardoi Pic.Serm.; Satureja ovata (Benth.) R.Br. ex Pic.Serm.Q124662691; Satureja ovata R.Br., nom. nud.; Satureja ovata var. cinereotomentosa (A.Rich.) Pic.Serm.; Satureja punctata (Benth.) R.Br. ex Briq.; Satureja punctata R.Br., nom. nud.; Satureja punctata subsp. ovata (Benth.) Seybold; Satureja punctata var. rigida Pic.Serm.; Satureja quartiniana (A.Rich.) Cufod.; Satureja remota (Balf.f.) Vierh.; Satureja schimperi (Vatke) Cufod.; Thymus cavaleriei H.Lév.

Species of flowering plant

Micromeria imbricata var. imbricata is a variety of flowering plant in the family Lamiaceae, native to Africa and the Arabian Peninsula. Under the synonym Micromeria remota it was assessed as "least concern" when considered endemic to Socotra.
