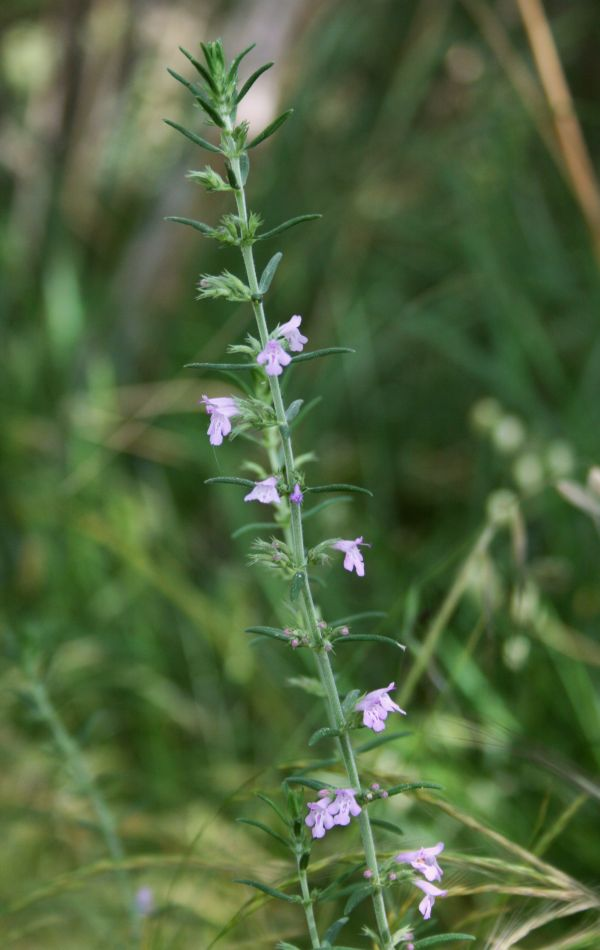

Scientific classification
- Kingdom: Plantae
- Clade: Tracheophytes
- Clade: Angiosperms
- Clade: Eudicots
- Clade: Asterids
- Order: Lamiales
- Family: Lamiaceae
- Genus: Micromeria
- Species: M. graeca

Binomial name
- Micromeria graeca (L.) Benth. ex Rchb.

Synonyms
- Satureja graeca

= Micromeria graeca =

Species of plant

Micromeria graeca is a plant species in the family Lamiaceae.

== Sources ==
This article incorporates text from a free content work. Licensed under CC0 (license statement/permission). Text taken from Micromeria graeca. Encyclopedia of Life.
