= Fig cake (fruit) =

Food prepared from figs

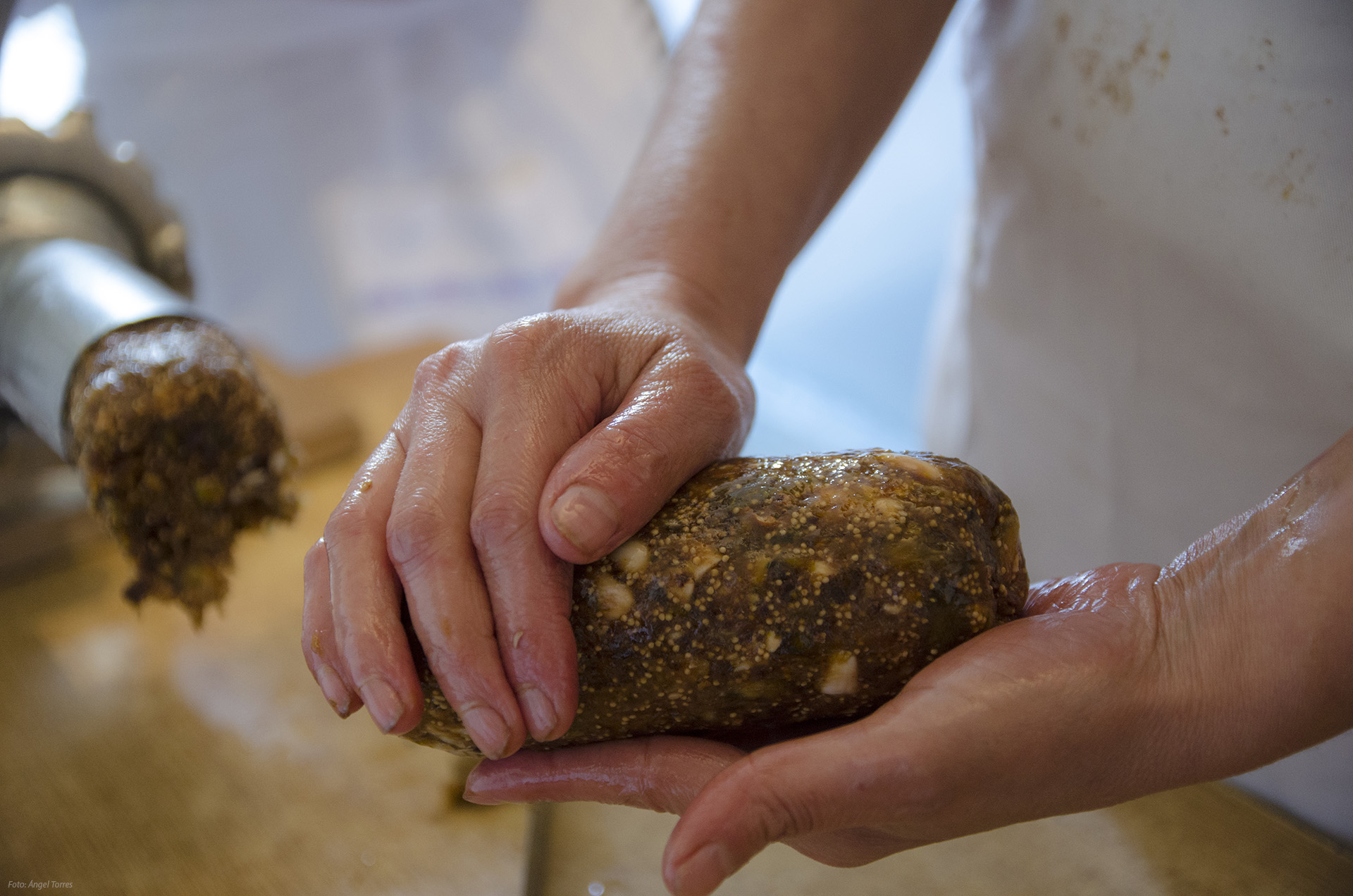
- Mechanically-produced fig cake (often formed into a round or square loaf)
- Type: Fruit
- Place of origin: Near East
- Main ingredients: Fig paste

A fig cake, or cake of figs, is a mass or lump of dried and compressed figs, usually formed by a mold into a round or square block for storage, or for selling in the marketplace for human consumption. The fig cake is not a literal cake made as a pastry with a dough batter, but rather a thick and often hardened paste of dried and pressed figs made into a loaf, sold by weight and eaten as a snack or dessert food in Mediterranean countries and throughout the Near East. It is named "cake" only for its compacted shape when several are pounded and pressed together in a mold.

== Historical references ==
Fig cakes have historically been used as food in ancient times. The Hebrew Bible mentions the food dveláh (Hebrew: דבילה) in several places:

Then Abigail made haste and took two hundred loaves [of bread], and two bottles of wine... and an hundred clusters of raisins and two hundred cakes of figs (דבלים), etc. (1 Samuel 25:18)

And they gave him a piece of a cake of figs (פלח דבלה), and two clusters of raisins, etc. (1 Samuel 30:12)

Moreover, they that were nigh unto them... brought bread on donkeys and on camels and on mules and on oxen, even food made from flour, [and] cakes of figs (דבלים), and bunches of raisins, and wine, etc. (1 Chronicles 12:40)

As early as the 1st-century CE, dried and pressed fig cakes were being delivered to a place called Beit Qarnayim. In the 2nd-century CE, fig cakes prepared in southern Palestine, near Keilah, were widely held to be more succulent and sweeter than other known varieties of dried figs and were, therefore, given special status. A field measuring 50 x 50 cubits with at least 3 fig trees or more could produce as much as 27.328 kilograms (60.25 lb) of fig cakes. Fig cakes produced in Bosra were thought to be of inferior quality to those produced in Palestine. The fig tree native to Syria (which in Roman times included Judaea), with its superb qualities, was eventually introduced into Italy, as attested by Pliny the Elder (23–79 CE).

== Manner of preparation ==
The old method of producing fig cakes is to take selected ripe figs that are most succulent and to pound them in a large, wooden mortar with a long wooden pestle. After kneading the mush together, it is taken up and formed into either round or rectangular loaves within molds. Once laid within the mold, the surface of the figs was smoothed off, either with liquids had from other fruits, or with smooth stones.

Another manner of preparation was to take figs that had already been dried and to open them up and put one on top of the other, producing cakes known as keziah (קציעה). Straw was often spread on top of them to help in their preservation. These, unlike the regular fig cake, did not last long and usually became worm-infested after a short time. They were made into round or square cakes.

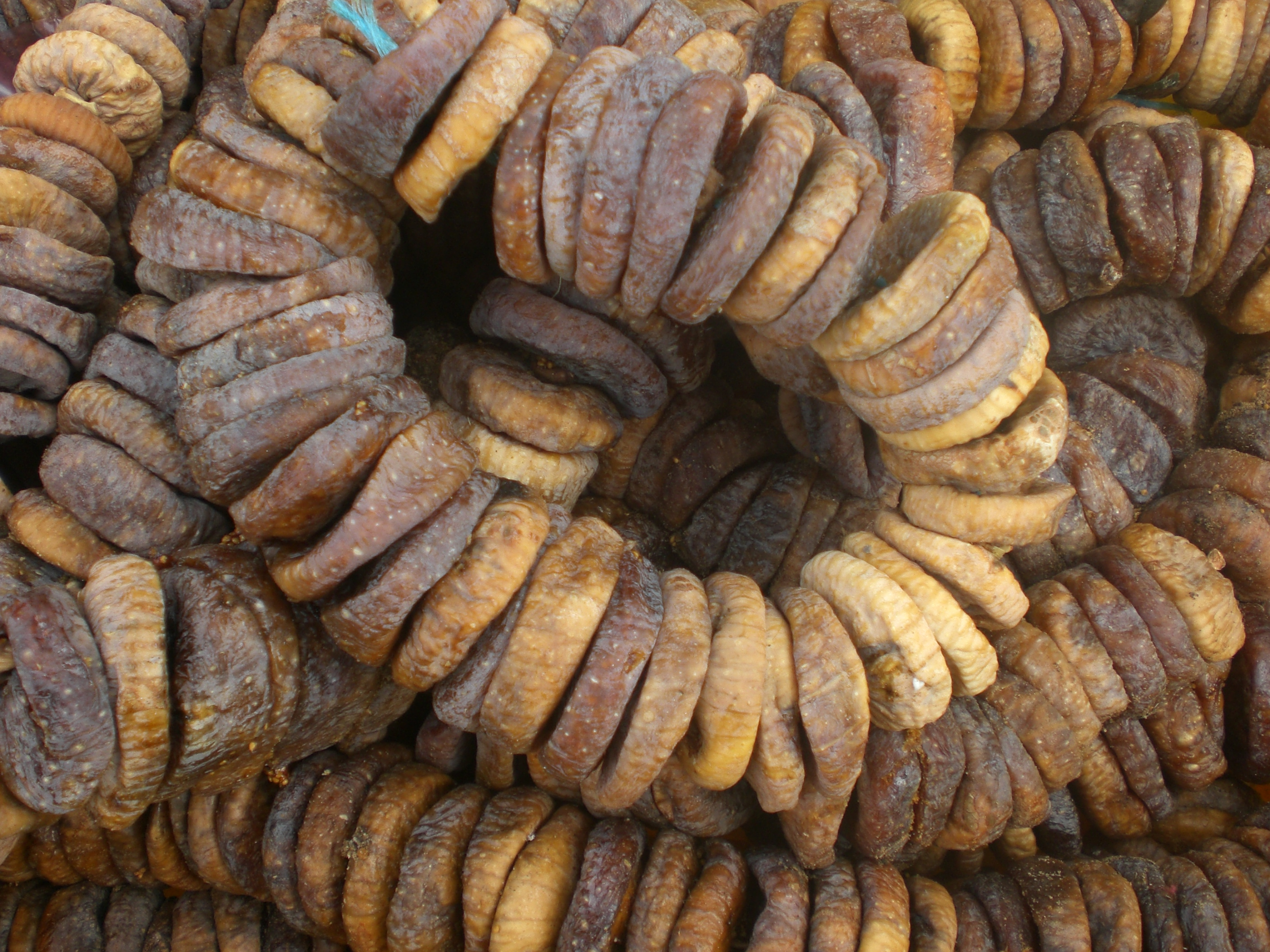
Strings of dried figs (Ar. quṭṭēn), as distinguished from a fig cake

Similar to the fig cake, but still different from them, are the ordinary dried figs (et-tīn al-mujafaf; quṭṭēn; et-tīn al-yābis) that have not been compressed together. The Arabic speaking population in the Hebron area often prepared dried figs (quṭṭēn = قطين) by laying them out to dry upon a large stone slab that had been covered with crushed leaves and stems of thyme-leaved savory (Micromeria fruticosa) for flavoring. This is also thought to have been done because of the Thyme-leaved savory's anti-fungal properties. Often, the process of drying was done on a flat roof top. In the drying, olive oil was sometimes added to the figs, to enrich and preserve them from mould or rot. In some places, anise (Pimpinella anisum) (Arabic: yānsūn) is sprinkled on the dried figs (quṭṭēn) to refine the taste. According to Maimonides, such figs were laid down upon mats to dry. In late Roman times, dried figs were packed in sealed earthenware jars for prolonged storage. Dioscorides mentions that, in his day, dried figs were packed together with the leaves of the female sort of phlomos (Greek: φλόμος), possibly a species of mullein (Verbascum spp.), to keep them from decaying.

Figs intended for drying are left on the trees until they are fully matured and rich in sugar. They are collected in baskets and spread on the ground or on rocks to dry. Progressive farmers spread them on mats. All drying is done in direct sunlight for about 3 days, depending on the temperature. Once dry, they are placed into a heap. This operation equalises the moisture in the heap, otherwise some will be too moist while others may be too dry. After a day the figs are spread out again and dried for another day. They are then ready for the bin. This dried fig is known as Goutein [sic]. Sometimes the figs are split in half with the fingers and put on rocks to dry. ...In many villages the split figs are struck together to form a ball about the size of a coconut. This is known as Dibleh in Arabic and Dvelah in Hebrew. These cakes are pressed and are mainly sold to the Bedouins who cut off slices as required.

In the Algarve region of Portugal, figs are dried over the platform roofs of traditional houses, while those that are kept for fresh consumption are laid over fig leaves or put into baskets made from cane. Those that are to be dried are placed upon cane mats and exposed to the sun. These are rolled up during the night to protect them from humidity. They are sun-dried in this manner for days, with a thin net placed over them to prevent insect infestation. They are preserved with rice flour.

=== Varieties of fig ===
Modern-day dried figs are often procured from Turkish or Calimyrna figs (Turkish: Kuru incir). Fifty-four varieties of figs are known to exist in Palestine. In Modern times, the varieties of figs grown for eating and drying, mostly by Palestinian Fellahin, are such types known in Arabic as Moazi (Mwazi), which is also known as Hurtemani. Other varieties used for eating and drying include the Hedari fig (also spelt Khdari), the Sbai, and the Shatawi. Those varieties used exclusively for drying are the Haroubi fig, the Sfari (a yellowish fig found in the Safed sub-district and in Nazareth) the Biadi and the Himari.

== Etymology ==
The Hebrew word for fig cake is dveláh (דבילה). In contrast, the Hebrew word used for a "dried fig" is grogereth (גְּרוֹגֶּרֶת), pronounced ğǝroğereṯ, or "dried figs" in the plural, grogeroth (גְּרוֹגְּרוֹת), pronounced ğǝroğǝroṯ.

Words related to dveláh appear in other Semitic languages. In Aramaic-Syriac: (ܕܒܶܠܬܳܐ) diblatua, dǝvelta means "dried fig; fig cake.". In Arabic D'bala (Arabic: ذبلة) means 'to press into a ball'.

== See also ==
- Fig roll
- Newtons (cookie)
- Pa de figues
- Pan de higo
