= Micromeria chionistrae =

Scientific classification
- Kingdom: Plantae
- Clade: Tracheophytes
- Clade: Angiosperms
- Clade: Eudicots
- Clade: Asterids
- Order: Lamiales
- Family: Lamiaceae
- Genus: Micromeria
- Species: M. chionistrae

Binomial name
- Micromeria chionistrae Meikle

Synonyms
- Satureja chionistrae (Meikle) Greuter & Burdet

Species of shrub

Micromeria chionistrae is a species of flowering plant in the family Lamiaceae. It is a suberect to sprawling hairy-glandular subshrub up to 30 cm high with pink-purple flowers, that emerge June–November.

== Habitat ==
It grows in crevices of igneous rocks at an altitude of 850–1550 m.

== Distribution ==
Endemic to Cyprus and common in the Troödos Mountains: Stavros Psokas to Kykko, Mavri Gremmi (Paphos Forest). Ayia, Prodromos, Kryos Potamos, Kyparishia (Limassol Forest).
