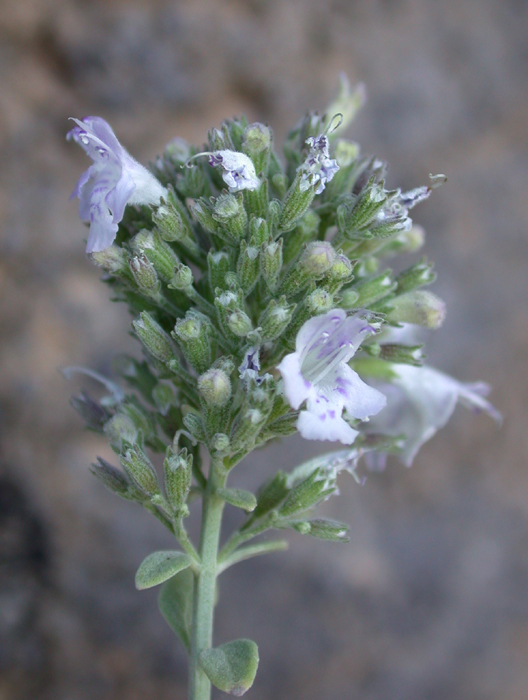

Scientific classification
- Kingdom: Plantae
- Clade: Tracheophytes
- Clade: Angiosperms
- Clade: Eudicots
- Clade: Asterids
- Order: Lamiales
- Family: Lamiaceae
- Genus: Micromeria
- Species: M. fruticosa

Binomial name
- Micromeria fruticosa (L.) Druce

Synonyms
- Clinopodium serpyllifolium subsp. barbatum (P.H.Davis) Bräuchler; Clinopodium barbatum (P.H.Davis) Melnikov; Micromeria barbata Boiss. & Kotschy; Micromeria fruticosa subsp. barbata P.H.Davis; Micromeria serpyllifolia subsp. barbata Davis; Micromeria serpyllifolia var. barbata Boiss.; Satureja serpyllifolia subsp. barbata (Boiss. & Kotschy) Greuter & Burdet

= Micromeria fruticosa =

Species of plant

Micromeria fruticosa (syn. Clinopodium serpyllifolium spp.), commonly known as white micromeria or white-leaved savory, is a dwarf evergreen shrub endemic to the eastern Mediterranean.

The plant's aromatic leaves (resembling mint) are used in making decoctions (herbal teas).

== Phytochemistry ==
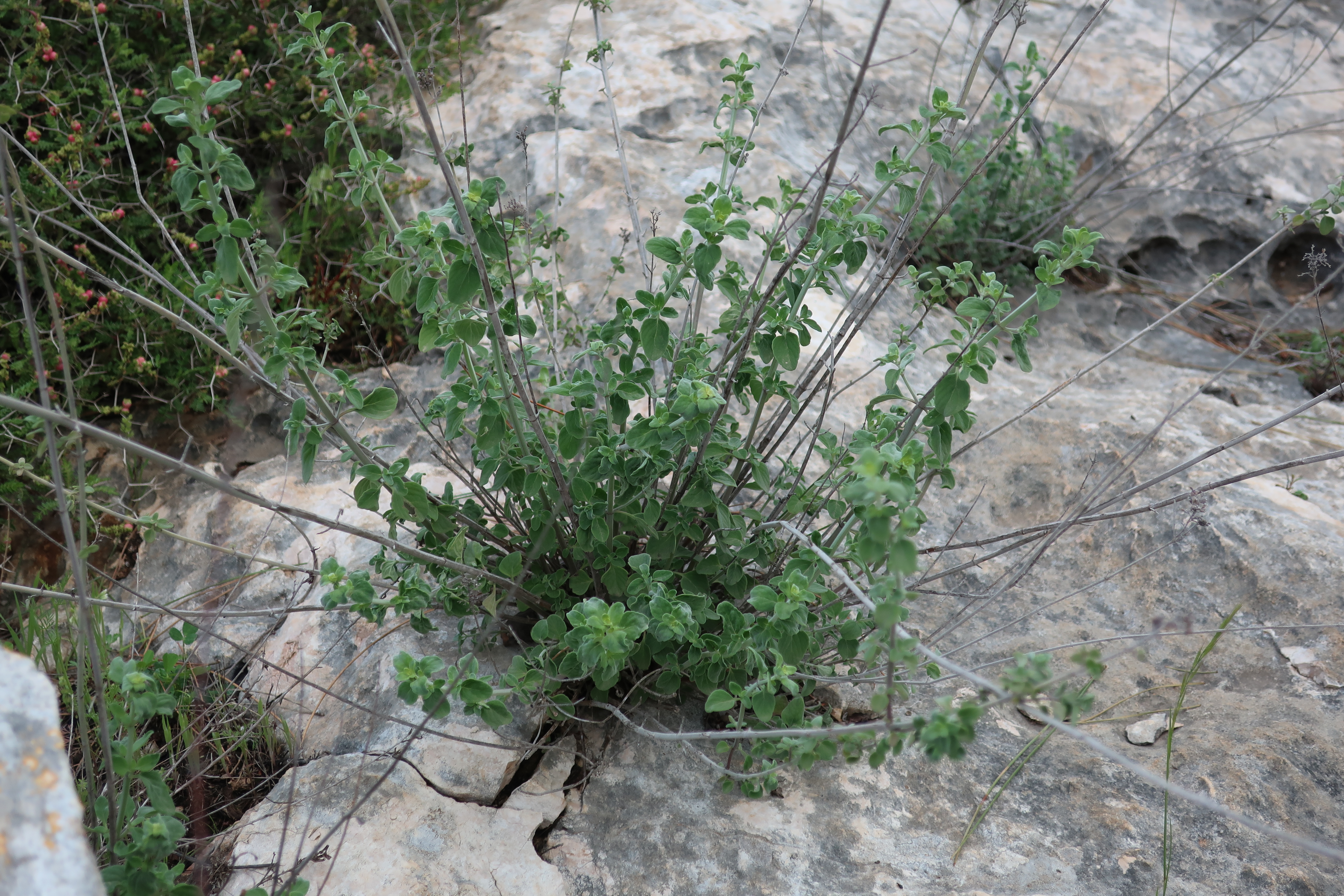
Micromeria fruticosa in habitat of Judean Mountains

A total of 215 phenolics and other chemical compounds were identified in the methanol extracts of M. fruticosa leaves. Of these, over 180 phytochemicals (87 flavonoids, 41 phenolic acids, 16 terpenoids, 8 sulfate derivatives, 7 iridoids, and others) are reported in Micromeria. Some of the metabolites separated are acacetin-7-O-rutinoside, apigenin 7-O-rutinoside, chlorogenic acid, coumaroylagmatine, lithospermic acid, rosmarinic acid, rutin, sagerinic acid, salvinorin C, santaflavone, and other sulfate derivatives.

== Taxonomy ==
International plant databases indicate other names for plants that are endemic to Israel–Palestine and surrounding areas, with several synonyms being attributed to a single species. In Palestine, white-leaved savory has been ascribed the genus and species Micromeria fruticosa (L.) Druce since 1913, both in dictionaries and on later websites, while worldwide the same species of plant has, since 2006, been recognized under the genus and species Clinopodium serpyllifolium (L.), and identified with the subspecies barbatum (P.H.Davis). Bräuchler thinks rather that it belongs to the subspecies fruticosum (L.), a species endemic to Spain and Italy.

It is a member of the genus Micromeria, in the family Lamiaceae. It is known as zuta levana (זוטה לבנה or זוטא לבנה) in today's Modern Hebrew and ashab a-shai (عشب الشاي) or (دقة عدس) in Arabic. The Bedouins call it by the Arabic name, qurniyya (Arabic: القورنِيه), believed to be a cognate of the Hebrew qoranit, an aromatic herb described in the Mishnah.

== Distribution and habitat ==
White-leaved savory is endemic to the eastern Mediterranean (Turkey, Syria, Lebanon and Israel). It grows mainly on rock surfaces in the low Mediterranean region, and is more common on chalk and calcrete rocks than on rocks of limestone. In the Levant its white blossoms can be seen between July and November.

Related species are found in the Balkans.

== Culinary uses ==
Besides tea which can be made by an infusion of its mint-flavored leaves, the Arabic speaking population in the Hebron area often prepared dried figs (Arabic: قطين, romanized: quṭṭēn) by laying them out to dry upon a large stone slab that had been covered with crushed leaves and stems of thyme-leaved savory (Micromeria fruticosa) for flavoring. This is also thought to have been done because of the thyme-leaved savory's anti-fungal properties.

The ideal time of foraging the plant is between late January and March.

== Medicinal uses ==
The plant, which contains a high concentration of the monoterpene essential oil known as pulegone, as well as isomenthol, is known for its medicinal properties. In folk remedies, it has been used in treating ailments such as abdominal pains, diarrhoea, eye infections, heart disorders, high blood pressure, weariness, exhaustion, colds and open wounds. Other usages include making a poultice from the boiled leaves and applying it onto burns and skin infections, or drinking an infusion from its leaves for relieving stomach aches, or gargling with the same for treating bad breath odors and gum infections.
