= Micromeria forbesii =

Conservation status
- Endangered (IUCN 3.1)

Scientific classification
- Kingdom: Plantae
- Clade: Tracheophytes
- Clade: Angiosperms
- Clade: Eudicots
- Clade: Asterids
- Order: Lamiales
- Family: Lamiaceae
- Genus: Micromeria
- Species: M. forbesii

Binomial name
- Micromeria forbesii Benth., 1834

Synonyms
- Clinopodium forbesii (Benth.) Kuntze; Satureja forbesii (Benth.) Briq.

Species of flowering plant

Micromeria forbesii is a species of flowering plants of the genus Micromeria. The species is endemic to Cape Verde. It is listed as endangered by the IUCN. It was first described by George Bentham in 1834. Its local name is erva-cidreira, or cidreirinha. In traditional medicine, it is used as an infusion for the treatment of indigestion, diarrhea, cough and to stimulate labour.

== Distribution and ecology ==
Micromeria forbesii occurs on the islands of Santo Antão, São Nicolau, Santiago, Fogo and Brava. It grows in semi-arid, sub-humid and humid zones, mainly between 800 and 1,600 metres elevation.

== Subspecies ==
There are three subspecies:

- Micromeria forbesii subsp. altitudinum Bolle (1860)
- Micromeria forbesii subsp. forbesii
- Micromeria forbesii subsp. inodora J.A. Schmidt (1852)
