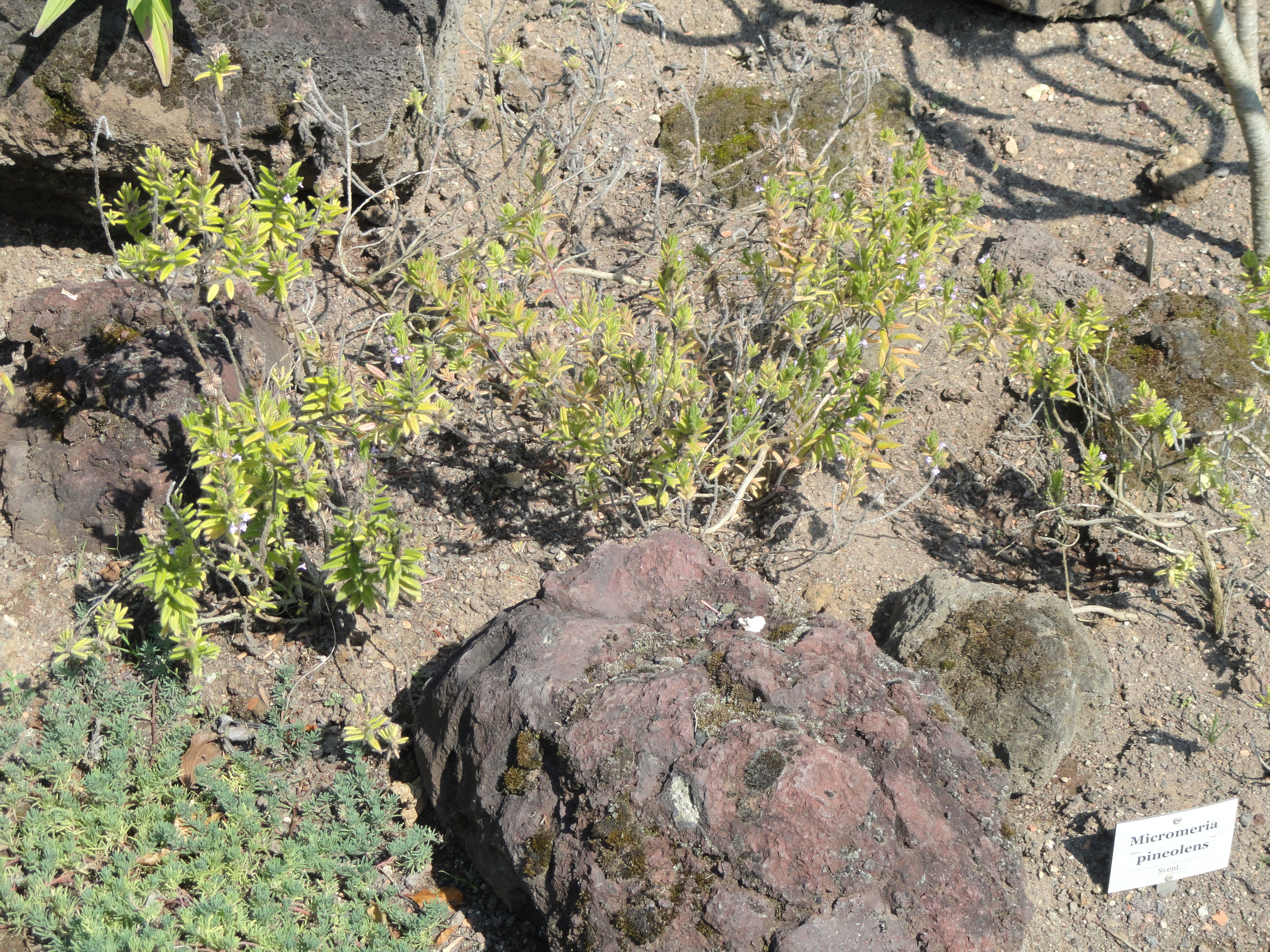

Conservation status
- Endangered (IUCN 3.1)

Scientific classification
- Kingdom: Plantae
- Clade: Tracheophytes
- Clade: Angiosperms
- Clade: Eudicots
- Clade: Asterids
- Order: Lamiales
- Family: Lamiaceae
- Genus: Micromeria
- Species: M. pineolens

Binomial name
- Micromeria pineolens Svent.

= Micromeria pineolens =

Species of flowering plant

Micromeria pineolens (tomillo del pinar, tomillón) is an endangered species of flowering plant in the Lamiaceae native to Gran Canaria in the Canary Islands. It is a woody sub-shrub, 30–70 cm in height, with hairy, yellowish-green leaves about 1.5 to 2 cm in length, and pink flowers.
