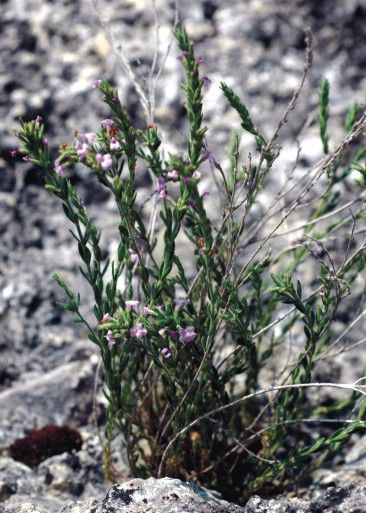

Scientific classification
- Kingdom: Plantae
- Clade: Tracheophytes
- Clade: Angiosperms
- Clade: Eudicots
- Clade: Asterids
- Order: Lamiales
- Family: Lamiaceae
- Genus: Micromeria
- Species: M. cristata

Binomial name
- Micromeria cristata (Hampe) Griseb.

= Micromeria cristata =

Species of flowering plant

Micromeria cristata is a species of flowering plants in the mint family, Lamiaceae. It has been found on dry rocky cliffs above Korita in Albania and on rocky limestone slopes at Lake Ohrid, North Macedonia. The plant flowers mid-June to early July, and fruits from July to August.
