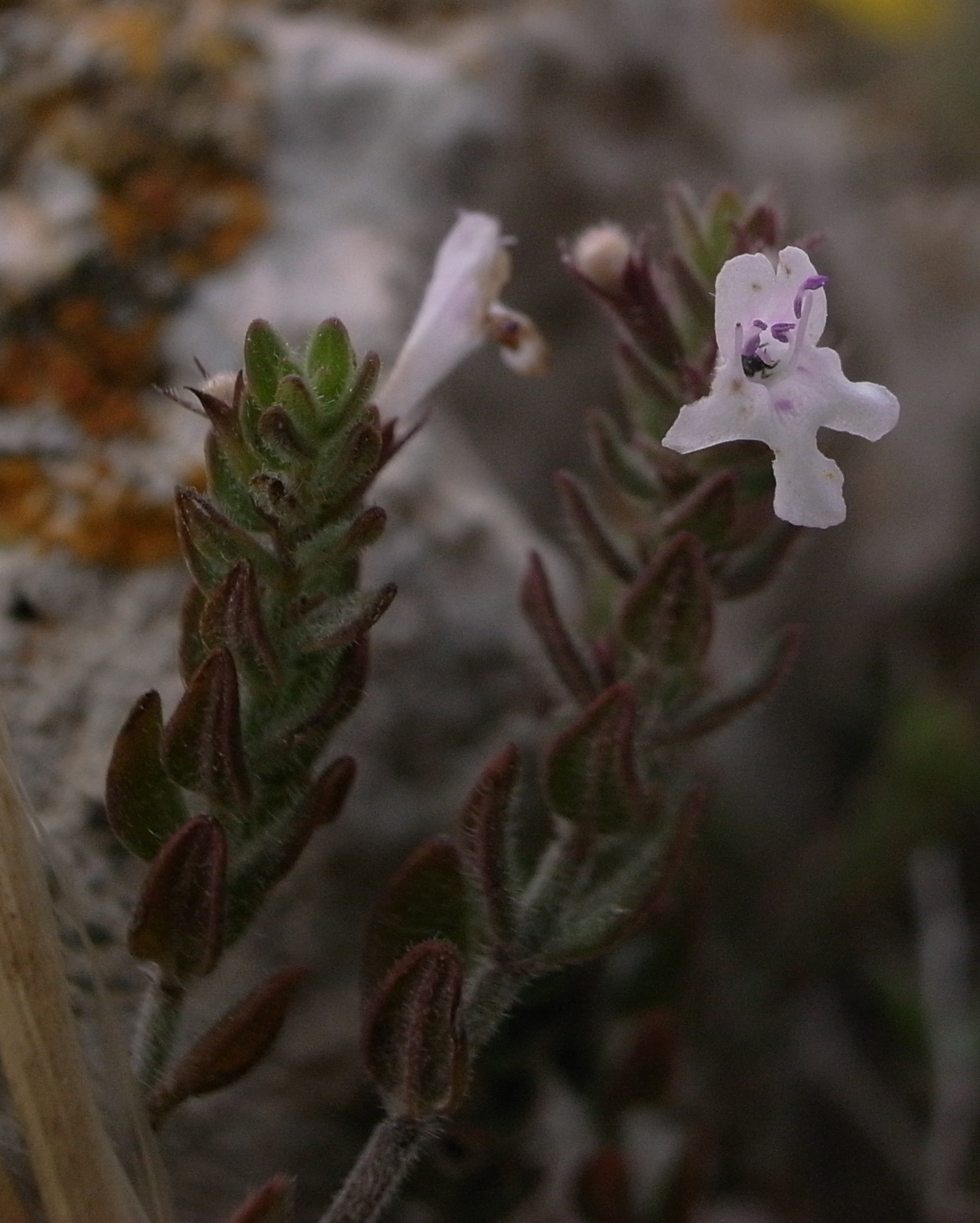

Scientific classification
- Kingdom: Plantae
- Clade: Tracheophytes
- Clade: Angiosperms
- Clade: Eudicots
- Clade: Asterids
- Order: Lamiales
- Family: Lamiaceae
- Genus: Micromeria
- Species: M. microphylla

Binomial name
- Micromeria microphylla (d'Urv.) Benth.

Synonyms
- Satureja microphylla

= Micromeria microphylla =

Species of plant

Micromeria microphylla is a species of plants in the family Lamiaceae.

== Sources ==
This article incorporates text from a free content work. Licensed under CC0 (license statement/permission). Text taken from Micromeria microphylla. Encyclopedia of Life.
