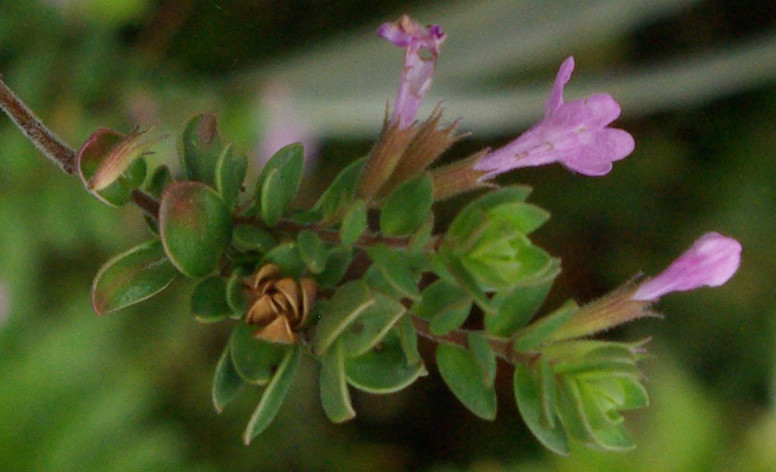

Conservation status
- Critically Endangered (IUCN 3.1)

Scientific classification
- Kingdom: Plantae
- Clade: Tracheophytes
- Clade: Angiosperms
- Clade: Eudicots
- Clade: Asterids
- Order: Lamiales
- Family: Lamiaceae
- Genus: Micromeria
- Species: M. glomerata

Binomial name
- Micromeria glomerata P.Pérez, 1974

= Micromeria glomerata =

Species of flowering plant

Micromeria glomerata, known locally as cliff thyme (Spanish: tomillo de risco) or thyme of Taganana, is a species of plant with woody chameleophyte flowers, belonging to the Lamiaceae family. It is a species endemic to the northeast of the Canary Island of Tenerife, whose description was first made in 1974, thanks to botanist Pedro Luis Pérez de Paz. It is a medicinal and aromatic plant with pink-purple flowers that grows at low altitude in the crevices of the slopes of the protected area of the Anaga Rural Park, located in the massif of the same name. The flexible, puberulose stem (Note: In botany, the term pubescent refers to any plant organ (leaf, fruit) or plant set that has a hairy surface, covered with fine, short hairs.) and with internodes can reach 10 to 40 centimeters in height. On the other hand, the leaves are small and flat, 8 mm long by 6 mm wide.11

In 1991, R. H. Willemse confused it with what he believed to be a new species, so he gave it the name of Satureja anagae, although this was eventually rejected. Its holotype, dated May 27, 1972, is kept in the herbarium of the University of La Laguna. Due to its small distribution and threats in its habitat, it is considered critically endangered. Some botanical gardens are involved in its conservation, such as the Conservatoire botanique national de Brest, which listed it in 2008.

== Description ==
=== Vegetative apparatus ===
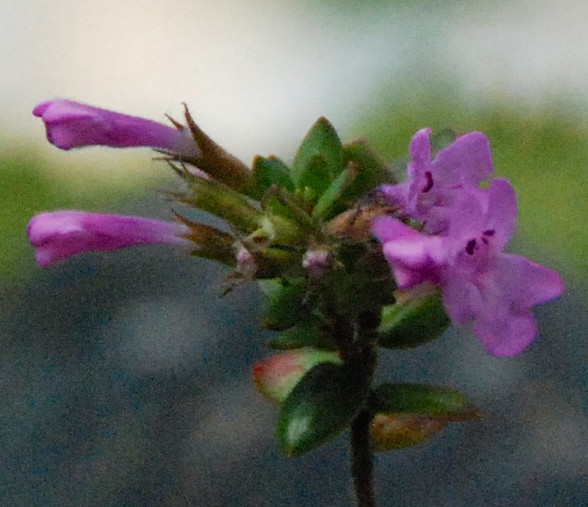
Flowers and leaves of Micromeria glomerata at the top of a stem

Micromeria glomerata is a chameleophytic plant, whose holotype, collected on May 27, 1972, is kept in the herbarium of the University of La Laguna. Depending on its habitat, Micromeria glomerata produces small woody stems, simple or branched, vertical or ascending, between 10 and 40 centimeters above the ground. These stems are flexible and puberulous, with very short internodes. In addition, the cortex of older ones turns red. At the top of the stems, the branching is dense and rather thin.

The leaves are small and flat (8 millimeters long and 6 millimeters wide), oval or lanceolate (lance-shaped), sessile or slightly petiolate, nervomarginalized, (Note: The Latin term nervosomarginiltis is used only by Pérez de Paz to describe the species of the genus Micromeria.) closely interlaced and often tinged red by anthocyanins, especially when highly exposed to the sun. These pigments play a photoprotective role: by absorbing UV rays, they reduce photoinhibition and photooxidation, acting as a shield for DNA and cellular components. The lower part of the leaves is slightly tomentose, and the upper part is glabrous and bright green.

=== Reproductive system ===
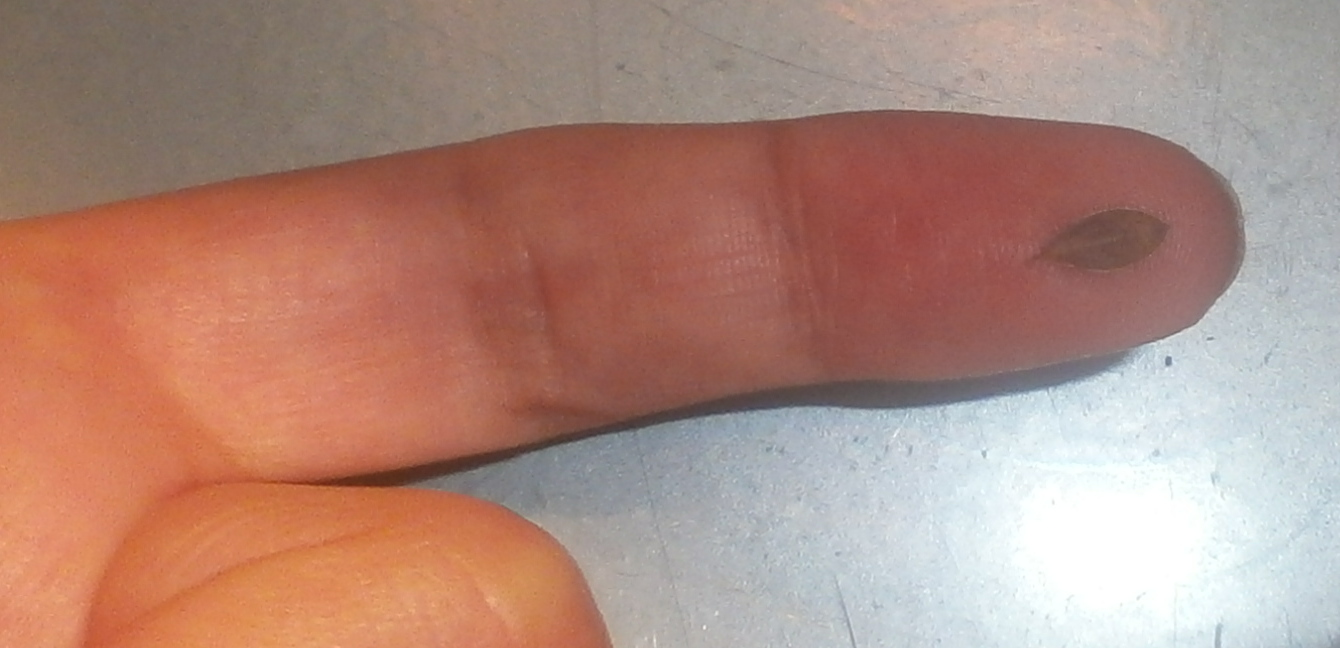
Comparison of Micromeria Glomerata with a finger

The flowers are about one centimeter long and are pink-purple in color; they grow clustered at the end of the annual branches, attached to the apex. Three to ten pedicellate flowers (Note: The adjective pedicellate is used to describe flowers that are provided with pedicels, meaning the structure that joins the flower to the branch that supports it.) grow on pedunculate stems, which have linear lanceolate hairy bracts 2 to 6 millimeters long.

The spicaster -inflorescences in the ears of the verticillium- forms a ring that completely hides the leaves. The cylindrical tubular calyx is slightly flared, with 13 to 15 ribs about 8 millimeters wide, bilabiate and subcutaneous teeth, hairy on the outside, glabrous on the inside and tinged with red. The corolla is about twice as long as the calyx, purple, hairy on the upper outer part of the tube and outside the leaf blade. The nuculae are oblong.

== Evolution ==
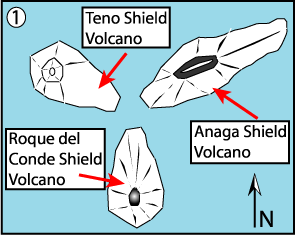
The three islands at the origin of the formation of Tenerife. Micromeria glomerata, developed in Anaga, is the oldest.

A phylogenetic study of Micromeria has shown that this genus, although monophyletic, has been divided into two subgenera, one exclusive to peninsular Spain and Morocco, and the other to the Canary Islands, including Tenerife. Furthermore, the Canary subgenus can be divided into three, based on the analysis of gene clusters. Micromeria glomerata belongs to the group of the three species present in the Macizo de Anaga, while the other two are Micromeria teneriffae and Micromeria rivas-martinezii. The group of Micromeria glomerata is the oldest that has been found in Macizo de Anaga. The time that separates Micromeria glomerata from the last common ancestor of its group is about 8.4 million years, while its most recent version is about 2.7 million years old.

The species was officially discovered on February 8, 1972, by Pedro Luis Pérez de Paz during a hike. On March 18 of the same year, Pedro took samples of the plant and distinguished Micromeria rivas-martinezii by its morphological characters and ecological niche. The species was officially added to the catalog of Micromeria species specific to the Canary Islands two years later.

The name Micromeria glomerata was proposed by its discoverer in 1974. Locally, it is called thyme, cliff thyme or thyme of Taganana. In 1991, R. H. Willemse gives a description of what he believes to be a new species, and gives it the name Satureja anagae. However, it turned out to be the same species discovered by Perez de Paz. The synonym name Satureja anagae is rejected in favor of Micromeria glomerata. On the other hand, the phylogenetic classification of the species has been under discussion since at least August 2015, due to recent findings on the diversification of the genus Micromeria.

== Distribution and habitat ==
Location of Anaga Rural Park and distribution of the species according to IUCN

Micromeria glomerata is endemic to the island of Tenerife, in the Canary Islands, Spain. It grows at an altitude of between 300 and 485 meters, in the protected area of the Anaga Rural Park, located in Macizo de Anaga, near Taganana. In 2004, about 490 specimens were counted, divided into two subpopulations with a tendency to increase. One of the endemic subpopulations has 460 individuals, the next has less than 30.

Lithophyte plants grow on steep phonolithic rocks and in crevices of steep slopes that are exposed to the north and northwest. There are two subpopulations, the larger one covering an area of approximately 2 km^{2}. In total, the territory covers 6500 m^{2}.

== Biology ==
Flowering occurs in spring (May and June) and fruiting in summer (July and August). During dispersal, the seeds emerge from the dry calyx and fly away. Micromeria glomerata partially loses its leaves in summer, while the remaining leaves take on a characteristic persistent reddish color.

== Endangerment and protection ==
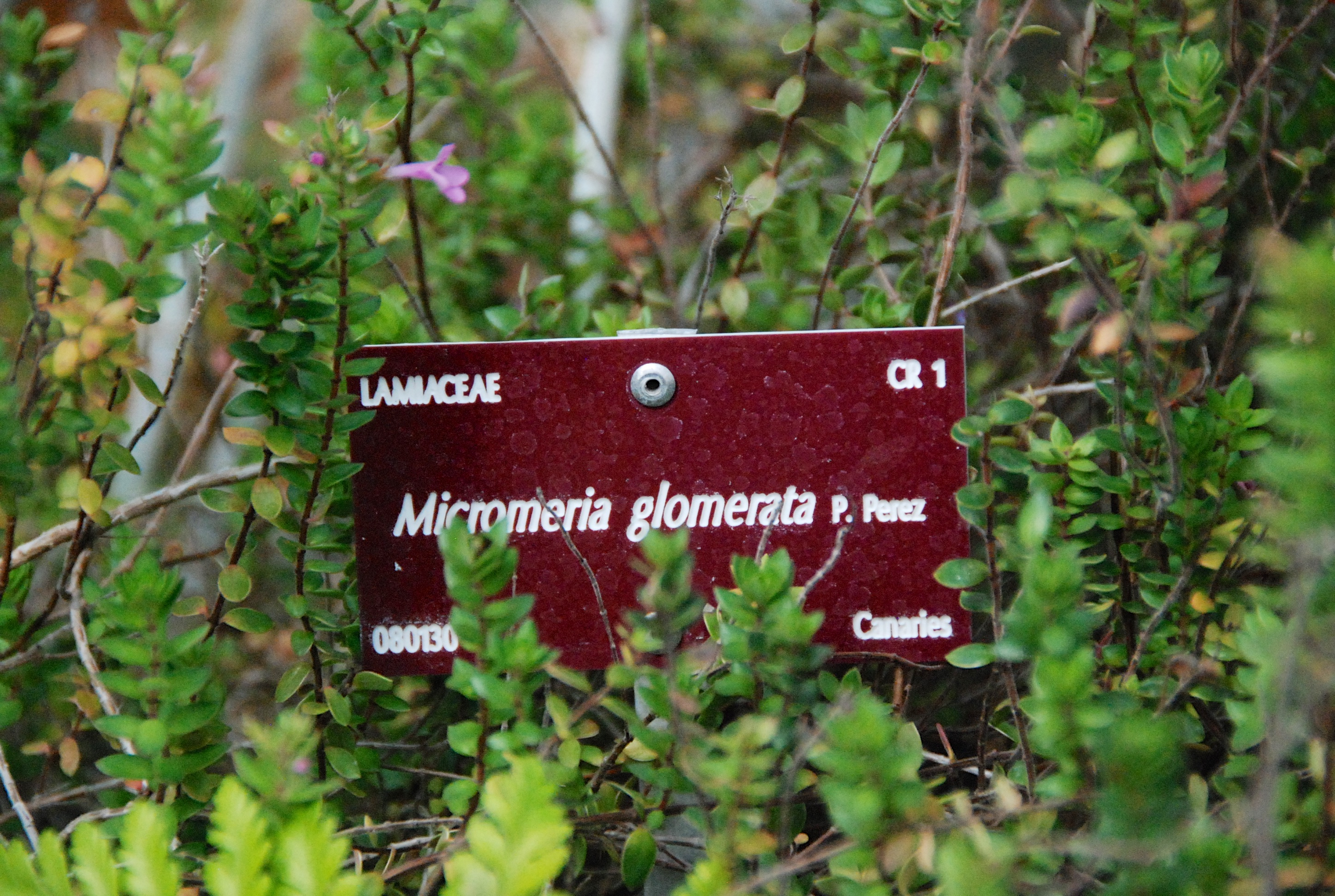
Species label at the Conservatoire botanique national de Brest

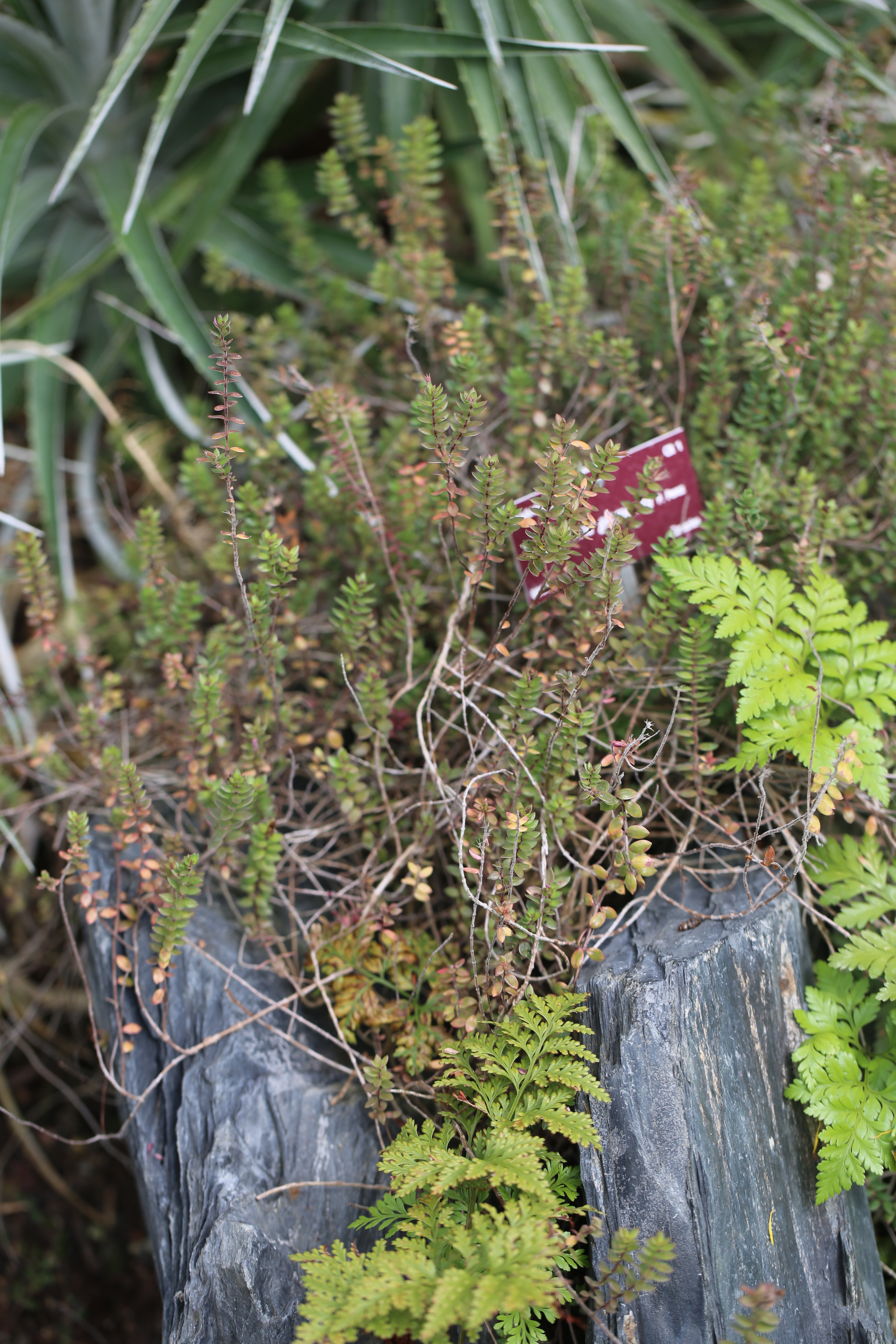
Micromeria glomerata in a reconstruction of its natural habitat, between two rocks

Within the genus Micromeria, Micromeria glomerata is one of two species classified as critically endangered by the IUCN, the other being Micromeria rivas-martinezii. Erosion of its original paleo-island has diminished the ecological niche available over time. In 1996, specimens were threatened by human activities, such as hunting or grazing, which limit their expansion. Propagation of the species in botanical gardens has been proposed to ensure its conservation. In 2010, efforts were focused on storing the plant in a germplasm bank and eliminating traces of grazing in the Anaga region.

The 2013 IUCN report notes that the sites where it is found are often inaccessible. Predation by rabbits and goats may limit expansion. Hybridization phenomena with Micromeria varia have been reported as a threat to this species. This occurrence is probably related to the short genetic distance between the two species.

Since 2008, the species has been cultivated in tropical greenhouses corresponding to the subtropical oceanic islands of the climate of the Conservatoire botanique national de Brest, following the mission of Mr. Yves Brien in the Canary Islands.

== Uses ==
This plant is of commercial interest as a rock border ornament, and is also used as an aromatic plant for its culinary qualities. Its use as a medicinal plant may have contributed to its rarification, although this is more uncertain than for Micromeria rivas-martinezii.

== See also ==
- Micromeria

== Bibliografía ==
- Bramwell and Bramwell (1990). David Bramwell and Zoé Bramwell, ed. Flores silvestres de las islas Canarias. Madrid: Rueda. p. 392.
- Bramwell (2006). David Bramwell, ed. «Medicinal plants of the Canary Islands», Medicinal Plant Conservation, IUCN, vol. 12, November 2006, p. 37-38. ISSN 1430-953X. Archived from the original on August 8, 2017.
- González González (2011). R. González González, J. A. Reyes Betancort, P .L. Pérez de Paz et M. C. León Arencibia, ed. Labiatae: Micromeria glomerata P. Pérez. Madrid: Dirección General de Medio Natural y Política Forestal y Sociedad Española de Biología de la Conservación de Plantas. p. 402-403. ISBN 978-84-8014-795-8.
- Santos Guerra y Romero Manrique (1996). A. Santos Guerra y P. Romero Manrique, ed. «Micromeria glomerata Pérez (Lamiaceae)», de César Gómez Campo. Libro rojo de especies vegetales amenazadas de las islas Canarias, Gobierno de Canarias. ISBN 84-920730-9-8
- Pérez de Paz (1974). Pedro Luis Pérez de Paz, ed. Micromeria glomerata, una nueva especie del genero Micromeria Benth, en la isla de Tenerife. p. 77-81.
- Puppo (2014). Pamela Puppo, Manuel Curto, Guillermo Velo-Antón, Pedro Luis Pérez de Paz y Harald Meimberg, ed. The influence of geological history on diversification in insular species: genetic and morphological patterns of Micromeria Benth. (Lamiaceae) in Tenerife (Canary archipelago). Journal of Biogeography. p. 1871-1882. doi:10.1111/jbi.12354.
- Puppo, Curto y Maimberg (2015). Pamela Puppo, Manuel Curto y Harald Meimberg, ed. Development and characterization of 16 microsatellite markers for Micromeria (Lamiaceae) from Tenerife (Canary Islands, Spain) using 454 sequencing. Conservation Genetics Resources. p. 743-749. ISSN 1877-7252. doi:10.1007/s12686-015-0451-5
