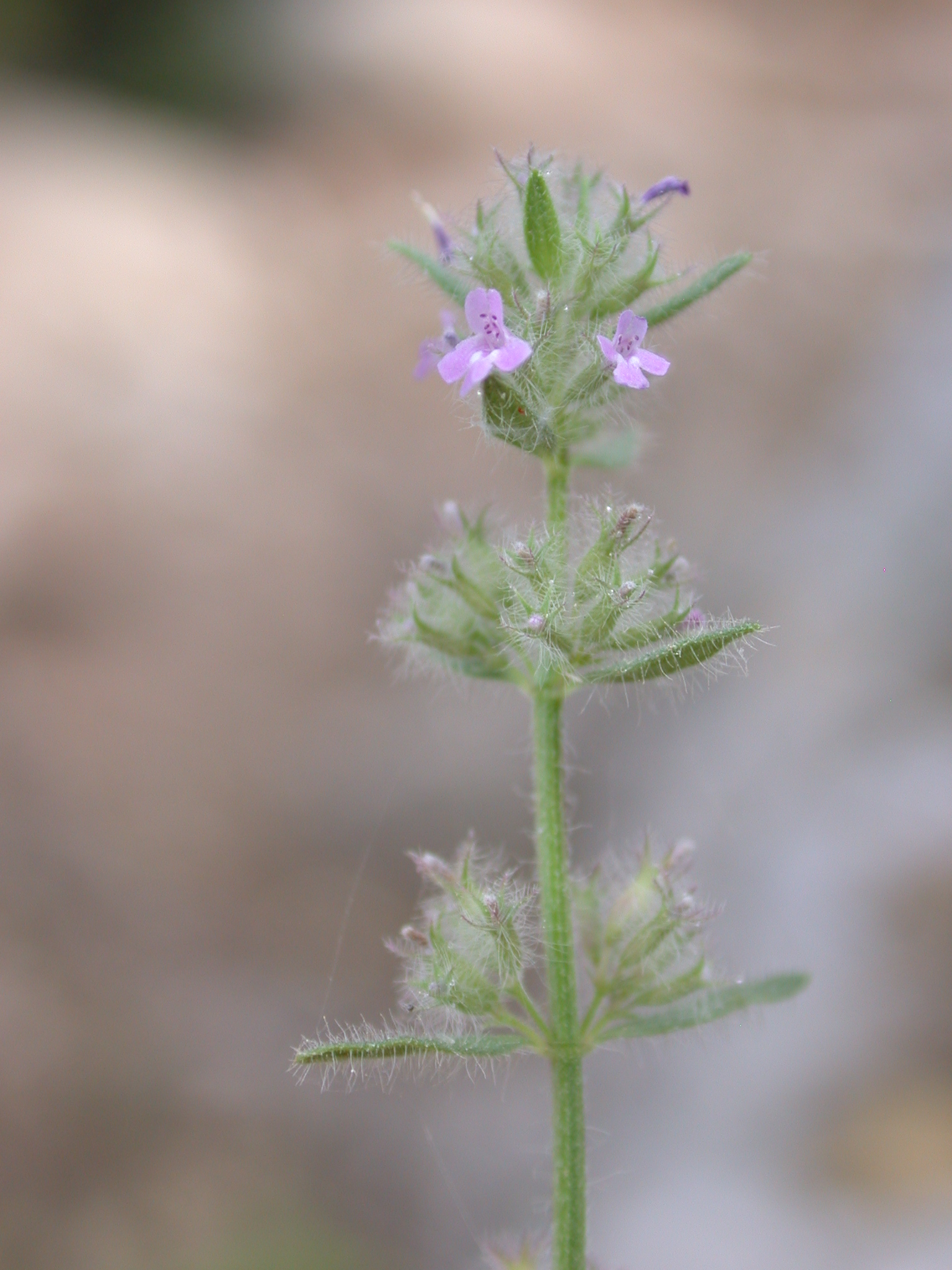
- Micromeria nervosa

Scientific classification
- Kingdom: Plantae
- Clade: Tracheophytes
- Clade: Angiosperms
- Clade: Eudicots
- Clade: Asterids
- Order: Lamiales
- Family: Lamiaceae
- Subfamily: Nepetoideae
- Tribe: Mentheae
- Genus: Micromeria; Benth.

Synonyms
- Sabbatia Moench; Zygis Desv. ex Ham.; Piperella (C.Presl ex Rchb.) Spach; Apozia Willd. ex Steud.; Cuspidocarpus Spenn.; Micronema Schott; Tendana Rchb.f.

= Micromeria =

Genus of flowering plants

Micromeria is a genus of flowering plants in the mint family, Lamiaceae, widespread across Europe, Asia, Africa, and North America, with a center of diversity in the Mediterranean region and the Canary Islands. It is sometimes placed within the genus Satureja. The name is derived from the Greek words μῑκρος (mīkros), meaning "small," and μερίς (meris), meaning "portion," referring to the leaves and flowers. Common names include savory and whitweed.

== Species ==
As of May 2023, Plants of the World Online accepted the following species:

- Micromeria acropolitana Halácsy - Greece (presumed extinct, rediscovered 2006)
- Micromeria × angosturae P.Pérez Gran Canaria in the Canary Islands (M. tenuis subsp. linkii × M. varia subsp. canariensis)
- Micromeria arganietorum (Emb.) R.Morales - Morocco
- Micromeria × ayamosnae Puppo & P.Pérez
- Micromeria aybalae H.Duman & Dirmenci
- Micromeria benthamii Webb & Berthel. - Gran Canaria in the Canary Islands
- Micromeria × benthamineolens Svent. - Gran Canaria in the Canary Islands (M. benthamii × M. pineolens)
- Micromeria biflora (Buch.-Ham. ex D.Don) Benth. - Himalayas from Afghanistan to Myanmar (India, Pakistan, Nepal, Assam, Bhutan, Guizhou, Yunnan)
- Micromeria × bourlieri Maire & Le Lièvre - Algeria, Morocco (M. graeca × M. inodora)
- Micromeria brivesii Batt. - Morocco
- Micromeria × broussonetii A.Santos, A.Acev.-Rodr. & Reyes-Bet. - Canary Islands (M. densiflora × M. varia)
- Micromeria browiczii Ziel. & Kit Tan - Greece
- Micromeria canariensis (P.Pérez) Puppo
- Micromeria carpatha Rech.f.
- Micromeria chionistrae Meikle - Cyprus
- Micromeria conferta (Coss. & Daveau) Stefani - Libya
- Micromeria × confusa G.Kunkel & P.Pérez - Gran Canaria in the Canary Islands (M. benthamii × M. lanata)
- Micromeria cremnophila Boiss. & Heldr. - Albania, Greece, Turkey, Syria, Lebanon
- Micromeria cristata (Hampe) Griseb. - Albania, Greece, Yugoslavia, Turkey, Bulgaria, Iran, Cyprus
- Micromeria croatica (Pers.) Schott - Albania, Yugoslavia
- Micromeria cymuligera Boiss. & Hausskn. - Turkey
- Micromeria danaensis Danin - Jordan
- Micromeria debilis Pomel - Algeria, Morocco
- Micromeria densiflora Benth. - Tenerife in the Canary Islands
- Micromeria douglasii Benth.
- Micromeria elliptica K.Koch - Turkey
- Micromeria ericifolia (Roth) Bornm.
- Micromeria filiformis (Aiton) Benth. - Corsica, Sardinia, Balearic Islands
- Micromeria flagellaris Baker - Madagascar
- Micromeria fontanesii Pomel - Algeria, Morocco
- Micromeria forbesii Benth. - Cape Verde Islands
- Micromeria fruticosa (L.) Druce - Turkey, Syria, Lebanon, Israel, Balkans
- Micromeria × garajonayii Puppo & P.Pérez
- Micromeria glomerata P.Pérez - Tenerife in the Canary Islands
- Micromeria gomerensis (P.Pérez) Puppo
- Micromeria graeca (L.) Benth. ex Rchb. - Mediterranean from Morocco + Portugal to Turkey
- Micromeria guichardii (Quézel & Zaffran) Brullo & Furnari - Libya
- Micromeria hedgei Rech.f. - Iran
- Micromeria helianthemifolia Webb & Berthel. - Gran Canaria in the Canary Islands
- Micromeria herpyllomorpha Webb & Berthel. - La Palma in the Canary Islands
- Micromeria hierrensis (P.Pérez) Puppo
- Micromeria hispida Boiss. & Heldr. ex Benth. - Crete
- Micromeria hochreutineri (Briq.) Maire - Algeria, Morocco
- Micromeria × hybrida Zagan - Greece including Crete (M. graeca × M. nervosa)
- Micromeria imbricata (Forssk.) C.Chr. - Africa from Nigeria to Ethiopia to Transvaal, Arabian Peninsula
- Micromeria inodora (Desf.) Benth. - Algeria, Morocco, Tunisia, Spain including Balearic Islands
- Micromeria × intermedia G.Kunkel & P.Pérez - Gran Canaria in the Canary Islands (M. benthamii × M. helianthemifolia)
- Micromeria juliana (L.) Benth. ex Rchb. - Mediterranean
- Micromeria kerneri Murb. - Yugoslavia
- Micromeria lachnophylla Webb & Berthel. - Tenerife in the Canary Islands
- Micromeria lanata (C.Sm. ex Link) Benth. - Gran Canaria in the Canary Islands
- Micromeria lasiophylla Webb & Berthel. - Canary Islands
- Micromeria lepida Webb & Berthel. La Gomera in the Canary Islands
- Micromeria leucantha Svent. ex P.Pérez - Gran Canaria in the Canary Islands
- Micromeria longipedunculata Bräuchler - Yugoslavia, Albania
- Micromeria macrosiphon Coss. - Morocco
- Micromeria madagascariensis Baker - Madagascar
- Micromeria maderensis Puppo & Bräuchler
- Micromeria mahanensis Puppo
- Micromeria marginata (Sm.) Chater - Alpes Maritimes in France, Liguria + Sardinia in Italy
- Micromeria × meteorica Hausskn. - Greece (M. cremnophila × M. juliana)
- Micromeria microphylla (d'Urv.) Benth. - Balearic Islands, Sicily, Malta, southern mainland Italy, Crete, Cyprus, Libya
- Micromeria monantha (Font Quer) R.Morales - Morocco
- Micromeria myrtifolia Boiss. & Hohen. - from Greece to Iran
- Micromeria nervosa (Desf.) Benth. - Mediterranean from Algeria + Balearic Islands to Turkey
- Micromeria × nogalesii G.Kunkel & P.Pérez - Gran Canaria in the Canary Islands (M. lanata × M. varia subsp. canariensis)
- Micromeria pedro-luisii Puppo
- Micromeria peltieri (Maire) R.Morales - Morocco
- Micromeria × perez-pazii G.Kunkel - Gran Canaria in the Canary Islands (M. benthamii × M. tenuis)
- Micromeria persica Boiss. - Iran, Iraq, Turkey
- Micromeria pineolens Svent. - Gran Canaria in the Canary Islands
- Micromeria × preauxii Webb & Berthel. - Gran Canaria in the Canary Islands (M. benthamii × M. varia subsp. canariensis)
- Micromeria pseudocroatica Šilic - Yugoslavia
- Micromeria rivas-martinezii Wildpret - Tenerife in the Canary Islands
- Micromeria serbaliana Danin & Hedge - Sinai
- Micromeria sinaica Benth. - Sinai, Israel
- Micromeria sphaciotica Boiss. & Heldr. ex Benth.- Crete
- Micromeria sphaerophylla Baker - Madagascar
- Micromeria × tagananensis P.Pérez - Tenerife in the Canary Islands (M. glomerata × M. varia)
- Micromeria teneriffae (Poir.) Benth. ex G.Don - Tenerife in the Canary Islands
- Micromeria tenuis (Link) Webb & Berthel. - Gran Canaria in the Canary Islands
- Micromeria × tolomensis Puppo & P.Pérez
- Micromeria tragothymus Webb & Berthel.
- Micromeria unguentaria Schweinf. - Ethiopia
- Micromeria weilleri (Maire) R.Morales - Morocco
- Micromeria × wildpretii P.Pérez - Tenerife in the Canary Islands (M. rivas-martinezii × M. varia)
- Micromeria zarkosii Kit Tan, Biel & Ziel.

== Formerly placed here ==
- Clinopodium bolivianum (Benth.) Kuntze (as M. boliviana Benth.)
- Clinopodium brownei (Sw.) Kuntze (as M. brownei (Sw.) Benth. and M. pilosiuscula (A.Gray) Small)
- Mentha japonica (Miq.) Makino (as M. japonica Miq.)
- Mosla japonica (Oliv.) Maxim. (as M. perforata Miq.)
